= Allyl alcohol =

Organic compound (CH2=CHCH2OH)

- Skeletal formula

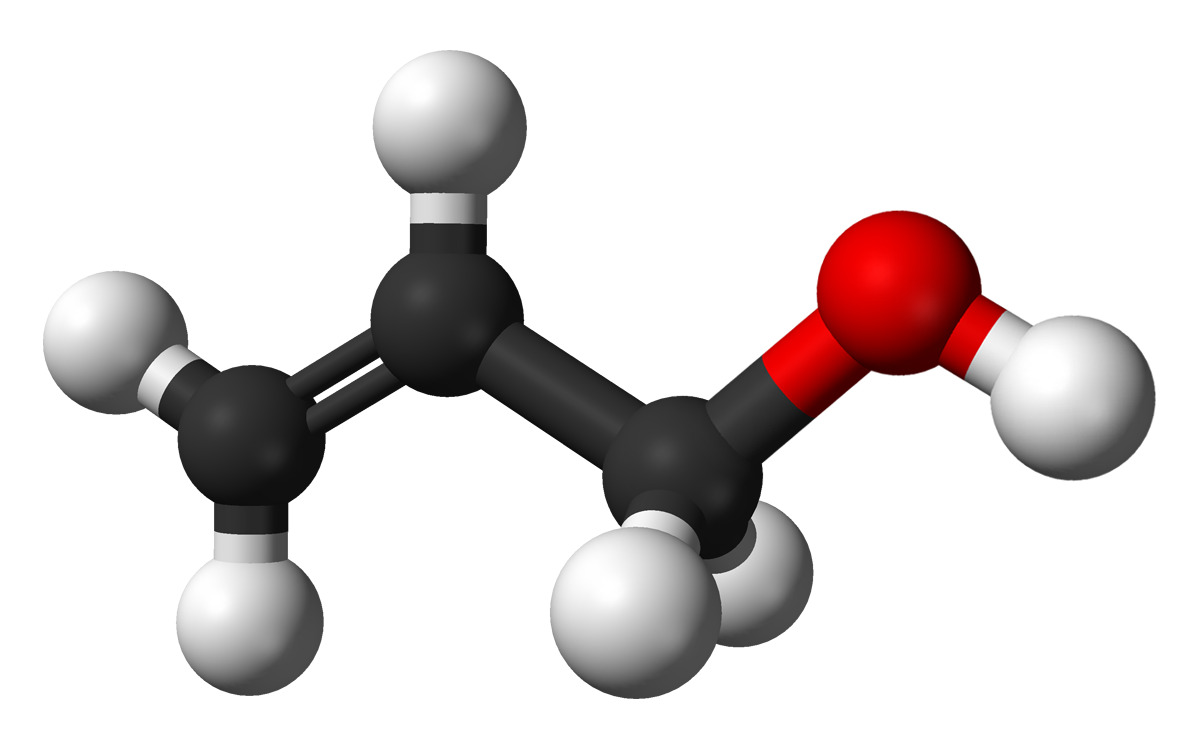
- Ball-and-stick model

Names
- Preferred IUPAC name Prop-2-en-1-ol
- Other names Allyl alcohol 2-Propen-1-ol; 1-Propen-3-ol; Vinyl carbinol Allylic alcohol Weed drench

Identifiers
CAS Number	107-18-6
3D model (JSmol)	Interactive image
ChEBI	CHEBI:16605
ChEMBL	ChEMBL234926
ChemSpider	13872989
ECHA InfoCard	100.003.156
EC Number	203-470-7
KEGG	C02001
PubChem CID	7858
RTECS number	BA5075000
UNII	3W678R12M0
UN number	1098
CompTox Dashboard (EPA)	DTXSID8020044
- InChI: InChI=1S/C3H6O/c1-2-3-4/h2,4H,1,3H2 Key: XXROGKLTLUQVRX-UHFFFAOYSA-N; InChI=1/C3H6O/c1-2-3-4/h2,4H,1,3H2 Key: XXROGKLTLUQVRX-UHFFFAOYAC
- SMILES: C=CCO

Properties
Chemical formula	C_{3}H_{6}O
Molar mass	58.080 g·mol^{−1}
Appearance	colorless liquid
Odor	mustard-like
Density	0.854 g/ml
Melting point	−129 °C (−200 °F; 144 K)
Boiling point	97 °C (207 °F; 370 K)
Solubility in water	Miscible
Vapor pressure	17 mmHg
Acidity (pK_{a})	15.5 (H_{2}O)
Magnetic susceptibility (χ)	−36.70·10^{−6} cm^{3}/mol

Hazards
- Occupational safety and health (OHS/OSH)
Main hazards	Highly toxic, lachrymator
- GHS labelling
Pictograms	(GHS02: Flammable) (GHS06: Toxic) (GHS07: Exclamation mark) (GHS09: Environmental hazard)
Signal word	Danger
Hazard statements	H225, H301, H302, H311, H315, H319, H331, H335, H400
Precautionary statements	P210, P233, P240, P241, P242, P243, P261, P264, P270, P271, P273, P280, P301+P310, P302+P352, P303+P361+P353, P304+P340, P305+P351+P338, P311, P312, P321, P322, P330, P332+P313, P337+P313, P361, P362, P363, P370+P378, P391, P403+P233, P403+P235, P405, P501
NFPA 704 (fire diamond)	3 3 1
Flash point	21 °C (70 °F; 294 K)
Autoignition temperature	378 °C (712 °F; 651 K)
Explosive limits	2.5–18.0%
- Lethal dose or concentration (LD, LC)
LD_{50} (median dose)	80 mg/kg (rat, orally)
LC_{50} (median concentration)	1000 ppm (mammal, 1 hr); 76 ppm (rat, 8 hr); 207 ppm (mouse, 2 hr); 1000 ppm (rabbit, 3.5 hr); 1000 ppm (monkey, 4 hr); 1060 ppm (rat, 1 hr); 165 ppm (rat, 4 hr); 76 ppm (rat, 8 hr)
- NIOSH (US health exposure limits)
PEL (Permissible)	2 ppm
REL (Recommended)	TWA 2 ppm (5 mg/m^{3}) ST 4 ppm (10 mg/m^{3}) [skin]
IDLH (Immediate danger)	20 ppm
Safety data sheet (SDS)	External MSDS
- Except where otherwise noted, data are given for materials in their standard state (at 25 °C [77 °F], 100 kPa). verify (what is ?) Infobox references

Allyl alcohol (IUPAC name: prop-2-en-1-ol) is an organic compound with the structural formula CH_{2}=CHCH_{2}OH. Like many alcohols, it is a water-soluble, colourless liquid. It is more toxic than typical small alcohols. Allyl alcohol is used as a precursor to many specialized compounds such as flame-resistant materials, drying oils, and plasticizers. Allyl alcohol is the smallest representative of the allylic alcohols.

== Production ==
Allyl alcohol is produced commercially by the Olin and Shell corporations through the hydrolysis of allyl chloride:

CH_{2}=CHCH_{2}Cl + NaOH → CH_{2}=CHCH_{2}OH + NaCl

Allyl alcohol can also be made by the rearrangement of propylene oxide, a reaction that is catalyzed by potassium alum at high temperature. The advantage of this method relative to the allyl chloride route is that it does not generate salt. Also avoiding chloride-containing intermediates is the "acetoxylation" of propylene to allyl acetate:

CH_{2}=CHCH_{3} + 1/_{2} O_{2} + CH_{3}CO_{2}H → CH_{2}=CHCH_{2}O_{2}CCH_{3} + H_{2}O

Hydrolysis of this acetate gives allyl alcohol. In alternative fashion, propylene can be oxidized to acrolein, which upon hydrogenation gives the alcohol.

In principle, allyl alcohol can be obtained by dehydrogenation of propan-1-ol.

=== Laboratory methods ===
In the laboratory, glycerol reacts with oxalic or formic acids to give (respectively) dioxalin or glyceric formate, either of which decarboxylate and dehydrate to allylol.

Allyl alcohols in general are prepared by allylic oxidation of allyl compounds, using selenium dioxide or organic peroxides. Other methods include carbon-carbon bond-forming reactions such as the Prins reaction, the Morita-Baylis-Hillman reaction, or a variant of the Ramberg-Bäcklund reaction. Hydrogenation of enones is another route. Some of these methods are achieved by the Luche reduction, Wharton reaction, and the Mislow-Evans rearrangement.

Allyl alcohol was first prepared in 1856 by Auguste Cahours and August Hofmann by hydrolysis of allyl iodide. Allyl alcohol can be formed by trituration of garlic (Allium sativum) cloves (producing from garlic in two ways: firstly by a self-condensation reaction of allicin and its decomposition products such as diallyl trisulphide and diallyl disulphide and secondly by the reaction between alliin, the precursor of allicin, and water). The compound's various connections with garlic give the allyl group its name (from Latin "allium" meaning garlic).

== Applications ==
Allyl alcohol is converted mainly to glycidol, which is a chemical intermediate in the synthesis of glycerol, glycidyl ethers, esters, and amines. Also, a variety of polymerizable esters are prepared from allyl alcohol, e.g. diallyl phthalate.

Allyl alcohol has herbicidal activity and can be used as a weed eradicant) and fungicide.

Allyl alcohol is the precursor in the commercial synthesis of allyl bromide:

CH_{2}=CHCH_{2}OH + HBr → CH_{2}=CHCH_{2}Br + H_{2}O

== Safety ==
Allyl alcohol is hepatotoxic. In rats, in vivo, allyl alcohol is metabolized by liver alcohol dehydrogenase to acrolein, which can cause damage to the microtubules of rat hepatocyte mitochondria and depletion of glutathione. It is significantly more toxic than related alcohols. Its threshold limit value (TLV) is 2 ppm. It is a lachrymator.

== See also ==
- Propargyl alcohol
