= Diallyl disulfide =

Chemical compound

- Diallyl disulfide

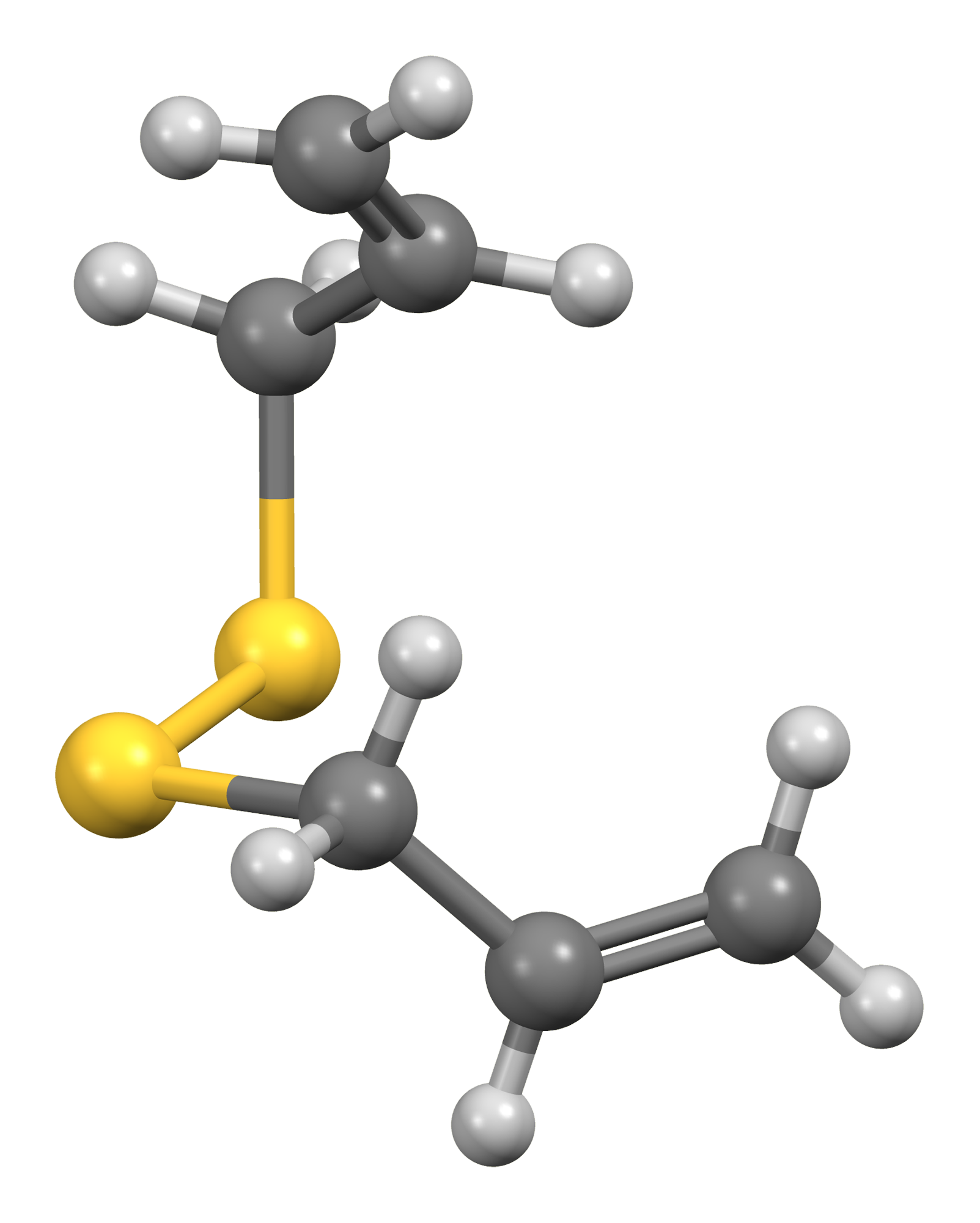

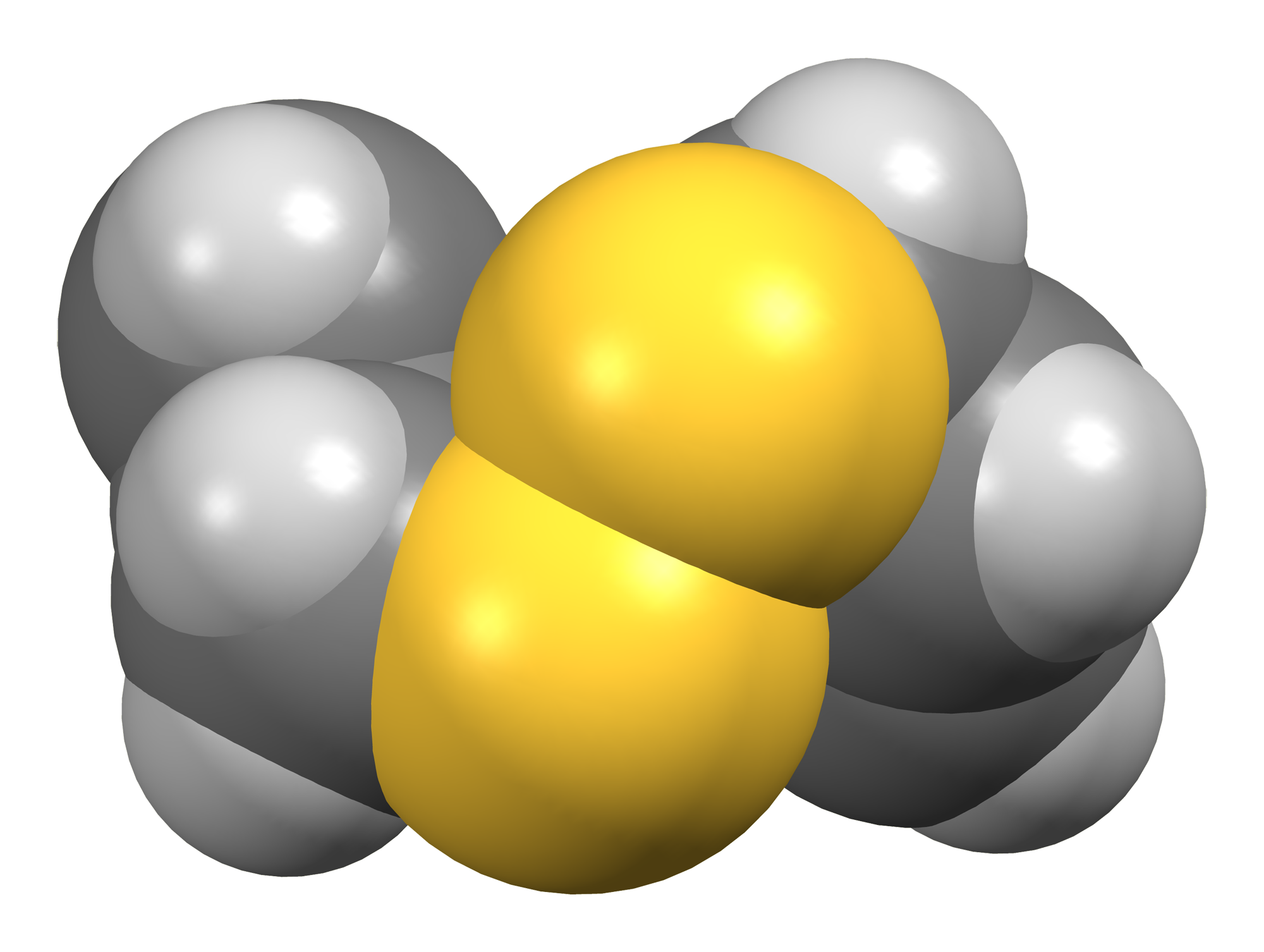

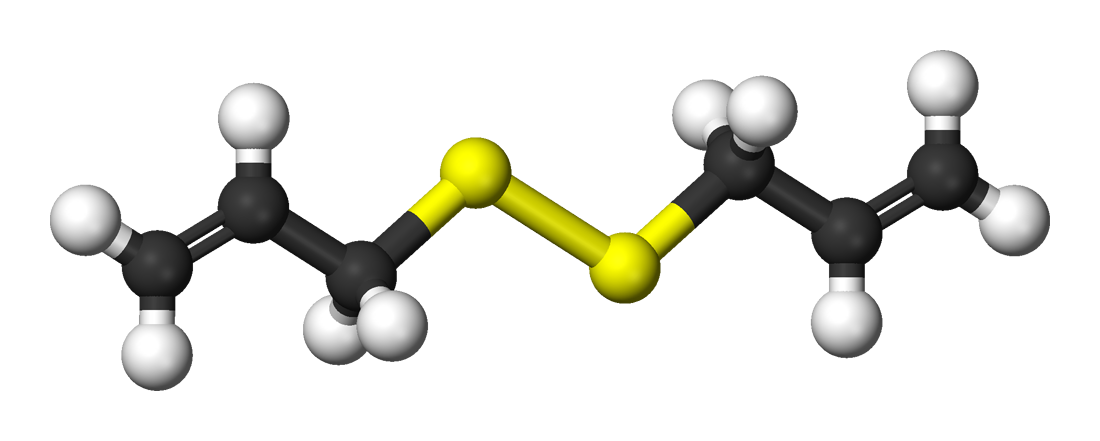

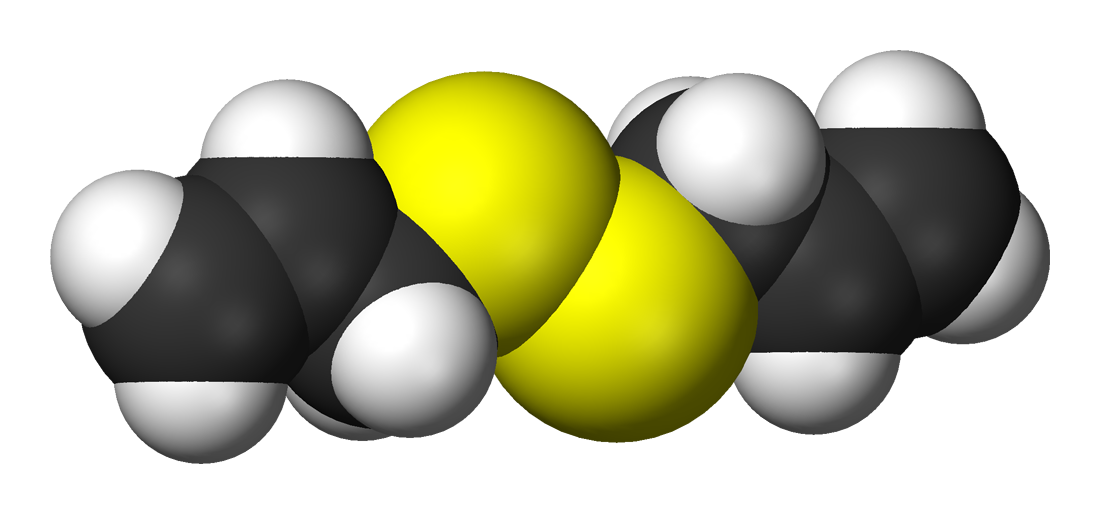

Names
- Preferred IUPAC name 3-[(Prop-2-en-1-yl)disulfanyl]prop-1-ene
- Other names Diallyl disulfide Garlicin; 1,2-Diallyldisulfane (not recommended); 4,5-Dithia-1,7-octadiene

Identifiers
| CAS Number | 2179-57-9 |
| 3D model (JSmol) | Interactive image |
| Beilstein Reference | 1699241 |
| ChEBI | CHEBI:4488 |
| ChEMBL | ChEMBL366603 |
| ChemSpider | 15730 |
| ECHA InfoCard | 100.016.862 |
| EC Number | 218-548-6 |
| Gmelin Reference | 217847 |
| KEGG | C08369 |
| PubChem CID | 16590 |
| UNII | 5HI47O6OA7 |
| CompTox Dashboard (EPA) | DTXSID9035206 |
- InChI: InChI=1S/C6H10S2/c1-3-5-7-8-6-4-2/h3-4H,1-2,5-6H2 Key: PFRGXCVKLLPLIP-UHFFFAOYSA-N; InChI=1/C6H10S2/c1-3-5-7-8-6-4-2/h3-4H,1-2,5-6H2 Key: PFRGXCVKLLPLIP-UHFFFAOYAX
- SMILES: S(SC\C=C)C\C=C

Properties
| Chemical formula | C_{6}H_{10}S_{2} |
| Molar mass | 146.27 g·mol^{−1} |
| Appearance | Yellowish clear liquid |
| Odor | Intense garlic smell |
| Density | 1.01 g/cm^{3} |
| Boiling point | 180 °C (356 °F; 453 K) |
| Solubility in water | soluble in ethanol and oils |

Hazards
- GHS labelling
| Pictograms | (GHS02: Flammable) (GHS06: Toxic) (GHS07: Exclamation mark) |
| Signal word | Danger |
| Hazard statements | H226, H301, H315, H317, H319 |
| Precautionary statements | P210, P233, P240, P241, P242, P243, P261, P264, P270, P272, P280, P301+P310, P302+P352, P303+P361+P353, P305+P351+P338, P321, P330, P332+P313, P333+P313, P337+P313, P362, P363, P370+P378, P403+P235, P405, P501 |
- Except where otherwise noted, data are given for materials in their standard state (at 25 °C [77 °F], 100 kPa). verify (what is ?) Infobox references

Diallyl disulfide (DADS or 4,5-dithia-1,7-octadiene) is an organosulfur compound derived from garlic and a few other plants in the genus Allium. Along with diallyl trisulfide and diallyl tetrasulfide, it is one of the principal components of the distilled oil of garlic. It is a yellowish liquid which is insoluble in water and has a strong garlic odor. It is produced during the decomposition of allicin, which is released upon crushing garlic and other plants of the family Alliaceae. Diallyl disulfide has many of the health benefits of garlic, but it is also an allergen causing garlic allergy. Highly diluted, it is used as a flavoring in food. It decomposes in the human body into other compounds such as allyl methyl sulfide.

== History ==
In 1844, Theodor Wertheim separated by steam distillation a pungent-smelling substance from garlic and named it "allyl sulfur." However, only in 1892 could Friedrich Wilhelm Semmler identify diallyl disulfide as one of the components of distilled garlic oil. The natural precursor of diallyl disulfide, allicin, was discovered in 1944 by Chester J. Cavallito and John Hays Bailey. In 1947, A. Stoll and E. Seebeck found that allicin in turn can be produced from the cysteine derivative alliin using the enzyme alliinase.

== Occurrence ==
Diallyl disulfide and the related trisulfide are produced by decomposition of allicin, which is released upon breaking the cells of the Alliaceae plants, especially garlic. The diallyl disulfide yield is the highest for the steam distillation of garlic bulbs which contain about 2 wt.% of diallyl disulfide-rich oil. Diallyl disulfide can also be extracted from garlic leaves, but their oil content is significantly lower at 0.06 wt.%.

== Extraction and representation ==
On an industrial scale, diallyl disulfide is produced from sodium disulfide and allyl bromide or allyl chloride at temperatures of 40–60 °C in an inert gas atmosphere; sodium disulfide is generated in situ by reacting sodium sulfide with sulfur. The reaction is exothermic and its theoretical efficiency of 88% has been achieved in practice.

Smaller quantities can be synthesized from the same starting materials, but in air and using tetrabutylammonium bromide as a catalyst. The corresponding yield is below 82%. The major problem, both in the industrial synthesis and in the extraction from plants, is separation of diallyl disulfide from higher sulfides (diallyl trisulfide (DATS), etc.). They have very similar physical properties and therefore, a typical commercial product contains only 80% of diallyl disulfide. The conversion of allicin to diallyl disulfide and trisulfide takes place particularly rapidly above 37 °C.

== Properties ==
=== Physical characteristics ===
Diallyl disulfide has a strong garlic smell. It is a clear, yellowish liquid which boils at 138–139 °C (for the typical 80% purity) and has its flash point at 50 °C, a density of about 1.0 g/mL and a vapor pressure of 1 mmHg at 20 °C. It is non-polar; therefore, diallyl disulfide is insoluble in water and is soluble in fats, oils, lipids, and non-polar solvents such as hexane or toluene.

=== Chemical reactions ===
Diallyl disulfide can be readily oxidized to allicin with hydrogen peroxide or peracetic acid. Allicin in turn can hydrolyze giving diallyl disulfide and trisulfide. Reaction of diallyl disulfide with liquid sulfur gives a mixture containing diallyl polysulfides with as many as 22 sulfur atoms in a continuous chain identified. When diallyl disulfide is heated it decomposes giving a complex mixture. The carbon-sulfur bond of diallyl disulfide is 16 kcal mol^{−1} weaker than the sulfur-sulfur bond (46 kcal mol^{−1} versus 62 kcal mol^{−1}, respectively), with the consequence that on heating diallyl disulfide gives the allyldithio radical (AllSS•), which through addition to the double bonds in diallyl disulfide followed by fragmentation and subsequent reactions generates numerous organosulfur compounds, many of which are found in trace amounts in distilled garlic oil. In the presence of a catalyst, diallyl disulfide can combine with alkyl halides forming 1-alkylthio-3-allylthio-1-propene and 1,3-di(alkylthio)propene.

== Applications ==
In the presence of iron chloride or copper chloride catalyst, or of liquid sulfur at 120 °C Diallyl disulfide can be used as a precursor for the synthesis of higher diallyl polysulfides (polysulfanes). In agriculture, diallyl disulfide and related diallyl polysulfides show useful activity as environmentally-benign nematicides. Diallyl disulfide is also a starting material for the synthesis of allicin. In the food industry, diallyl disulfide is used to improve the taste of meat, vegetables and fruits.

== Biological importance ==
=== Smell and taste ===
The unpleasant smell of diallyl disulfide is perceived through the transient receptor potential cation channel, member A1 (TRPA1). This ion channel had long been present not only in humans and animals, but even in fungi. Thus, Alliaceae plants have likely developed the diallyl disulfide-TRPA1 protection mechanism against predators at the early stages of the evolution.

=== Poisoning and detoxification ===
Diallyl disulfide is an efficient agent for detoxication of the cells. It significantly increases the production of the enzyme glutathione S-transferase (GST), which binds electrophilic toxins in the cell. Garlic therefore supports, for example, the detoxification function of liver cells in vitro and protects nerve cells from oxidative stress, also in vitro. The detoxification effect may prevent symptoms of inflammation. This was confirmed in a study on rats where prolonged administration of diallyl disulfide protected poisoning of their intestinal cells. This study also showed that certain side effects of high doses of garlic oil are not attributable to the diallyl disulfide. By supporting the detoxification activity in the liver, diallyl disulfide might offer liver protection during the chemotherapy, e.g. against cyanide detoxification.

=== Antimicrobial effect ===
The release of organosulfur compounds upon destruction of Alliaceae plant cells has great importance, because of the antimicrobial, insecticidal and larvicidal properties of those compounds. In particular, diallyl disulfide is the main reason for inhibiting the growth of molds and bacteria by garlic oil. It is also acts against the stomach ulcer germ Helicobacter pylori, however not as efficiently as allicin. Because of its antimicrobial effects, diallyl disulfide, together with tobramycin, is included in preparations which are used for selective decontamination of the organs (e.g. gut) before surgical operations. A clinical study showed that such preparations prevent endotoxemia in heart valve operations.

=== Protection against colon cancer ===
Garlic can prevent colorectal cancer, and several studies revealed that diallyl disulfide is a major component responsible for this action. The effect is dose dependent as demonstrated on mice. Diallyl disulfide affects cancer cells much more strongly than normal cells. It also results in a strong and dose-dependent accumulation of several agents, such as reactive oxygen species, which activate enzyme and lead to destruction of cancer cells.

=== Protection against cardiovascular disease ===
There is evidence that garlic may prevent the development of cardiovascular diseases. A possible reason for some of these diseases, such as atherosclerosis or coronary heart disease is oxidative stress. The latter is reduced by diallyl disulfide by assisting in the detoxification of the cell, as well as some other mechanisms. By activating the TRPA1 ion channel, diallyl disulfide leads to a short-term lowering of blood pressure.

== Safety ==
Diallyl disulfide is a skin irritant and an allergen. In particular, it is the main cause of garlic allergy (allergic contact dermatitis to garlic). The allergy usually starts at the fingertips and cannot be prevented by wearing gloves because diallyl disulfide penetrates through most commercial glove types.

The median lethal dose (LD_{50}) for oral intake in rats is 260 mg per kg of body weight and it is 3.6 g/kg for dermal intake. High doses of 5 g/kg placed on the skin of cats cause death through hemolytic anemia.

Diallyl disulfide can be easily detected in the air or in the blood with gas chromatography. Dermal emission of diallyl disulfide can be measured by gas chromatography following collection of skin gas samples.

== See also ==
- Allyl propyl disulfide
