= Garlic allergy =

Type of skin allergy caused by garlic

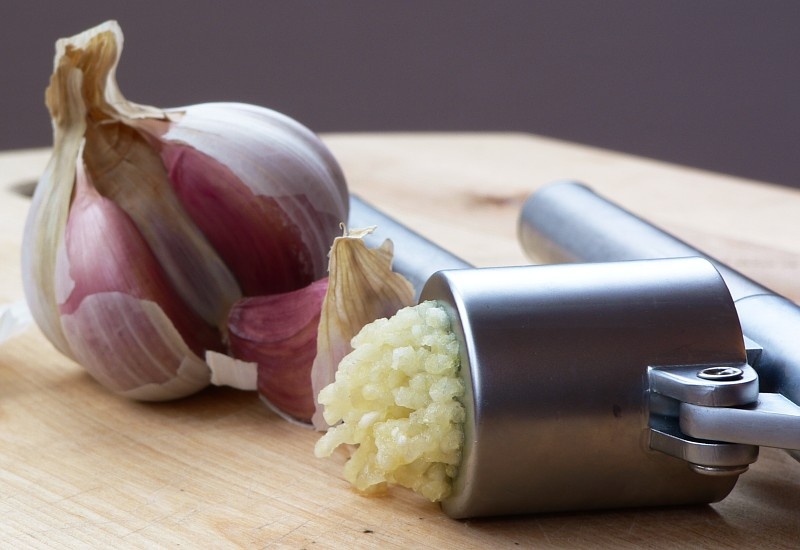
A garlic bulb next to a clove crushed in a garlic press

Garlic allergy or allergic contact dermatitis to garlic is a common inflammatory skin condition caused by contact with garlic oil or dust. It mostly affects people who cut and handle fresh garlic, such as chefs, and presents on the tips of the thumb, index and middle fingers of the non-dominant hand (which typically hold garlic bulbs during the cutting). The affected fingertips show an asymmetrical pattern of fissure as well as thickening and shedding of the outer skin layers, which may progress to second- or third-degree burn of injured skin.

Garlic dermatitis is similar to the tulip dermatitis and is induced by a combined mechanical and chemical action. Whereas the former mechanism acts via skin rubbing which progresses into damage, the major cause of the latter is the chemical diallyl disulfide (DADS), together with related compounds allyl propyl disulfide and allicin. These chemicals occur in oils of plants of the genus Allium, including garlic, onion and leek.

Garlic allergy has been known since at least 1950. It is not limited to hand contact, but can also be induced, with different symptoms, by inhaling garlic dust or ingesting raw garlic, though the latter cases are relatively rare. DADS penetrates through most types of commercial gloves, and thus wearing gloves while handling garlic has proven inefficient against the allergy. Treatment includes avoiding any contact with garlic oil or vapours, as well as medication, such as administering acitretin (25 mg/day, orally) or applying psoralen and ultraviolet light to the affected skin area over a period of 12 weeks (PUVA therapy).

== See also ==
- List of allergies
- Petition to include garlic in the EU list of allergens
