= S-alkyl-L-cysteine sulfoxide lyase =

S-alkyl-L-cysteine sulfoxide lyase may refer to:

- S-alkylcysteine lyase, an enzyme
- Alliinase, an enzyme
