= C3H8OS =

The molecular formula C_{3}H_{8}OS may refer to:

- Dimethylsulfoxonium methylide
- 3-Mercapto-1-propanol
