= Pentathiepine =

Identifiers
CAS Number	32711-17-4
3D model (JSmol)	Interactive image
ChemSpider	25946925
PubChem CID	53696760
CompTox Dashboard (EPA)	DTXSID90706024
- InChI: InChI=1S/C2H2S5/c1-2-4-6-7-5-3-1/h1-2H Key: BRCAXRYKWZIFOK-UHFFFAOYSA-N
- SMILES: C1=CSSSSS1

Properties
Appearance	pale yellow solid

Related compounds
Related compounds	Pentathiepane, tetrathiepine, 1,2,5-Trithiepane
- Except where otherwise noted, data are given for materials in their standard state (at 25 °C [77 °F], 100 kPa). Infobox references

Pentathiepine is an organosulfur compound and sulfur heterocycle with the formula (CH)_{2}S_{5}. Many derivatives are known, often with a benzo group (C_{6}H_{4}) in place of the alkene. Such compounds are derivatives of 1,2-benzenedithiol:

C_{6}H_{4}(SH)_{2} + 0.5 S_{8} → C_{6}H_{4}(S_{5}) + H_{2}S

== Related compounds ==
Varacin is a naturally-occurring pentathiepine

Substituted benzopentathiepines occur naturally in the form of varacin and the lissoclinotoxins.
