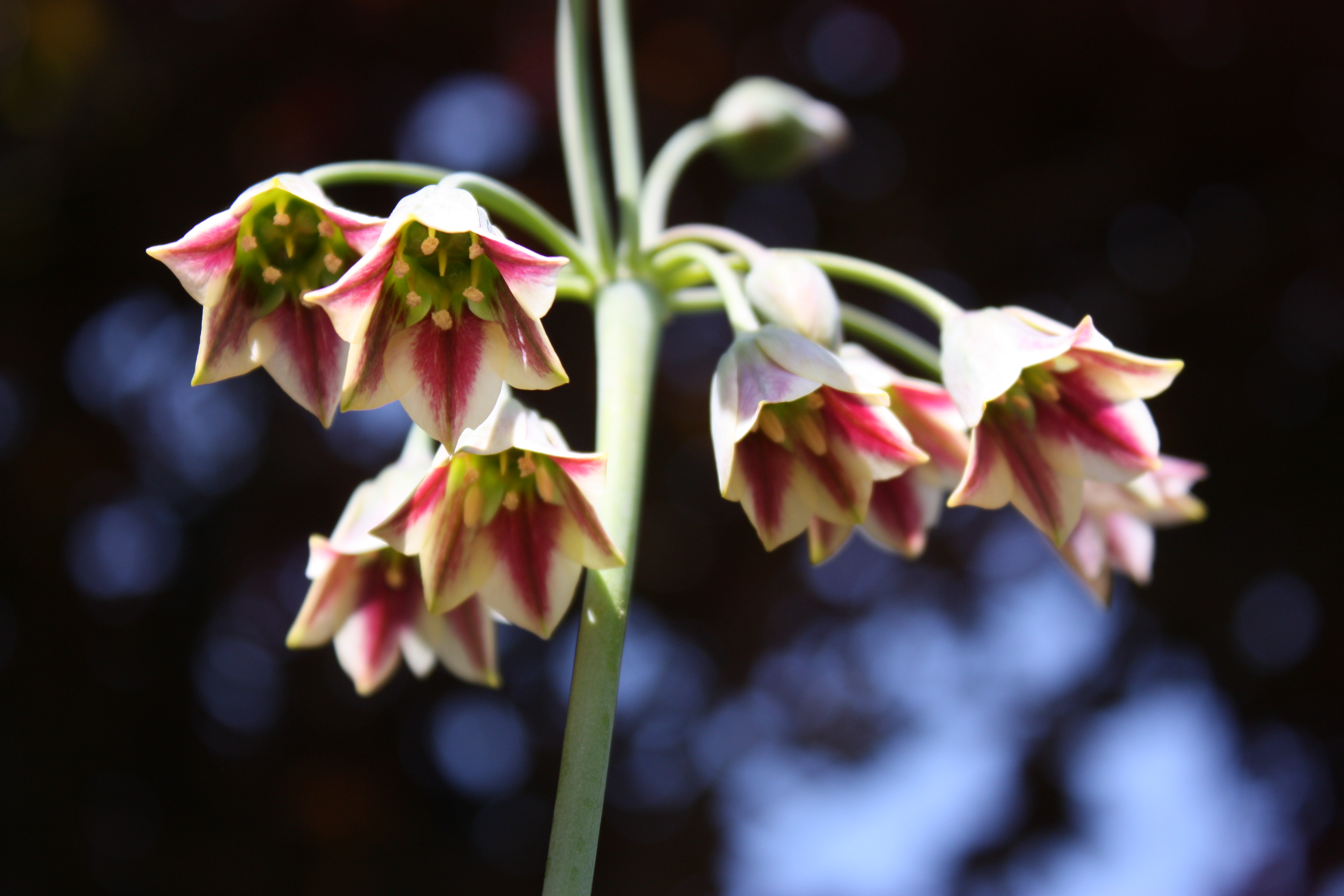
- Inflorescence
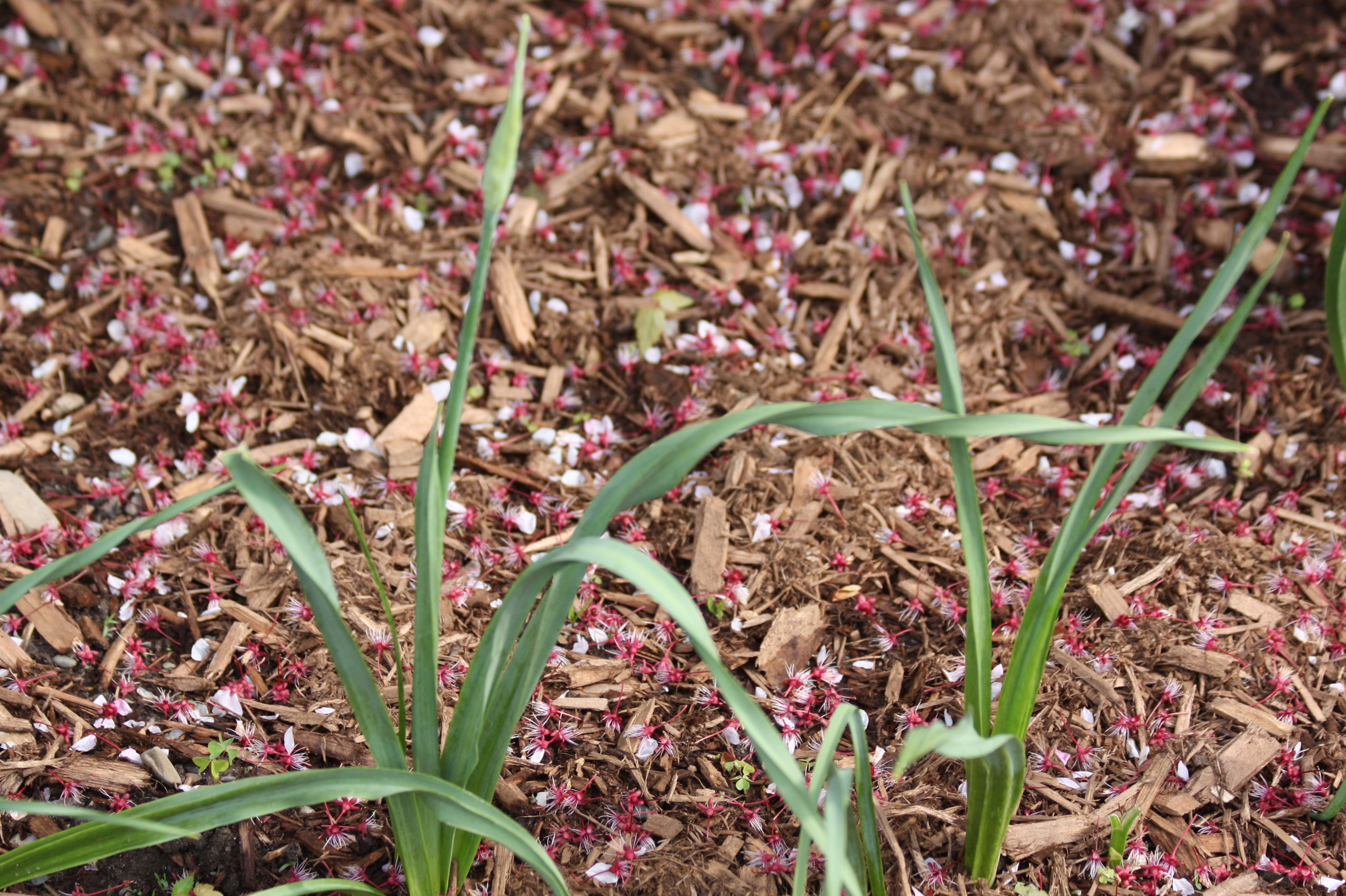
- Foliage

Scientific classification
- Kingdom: Plantae
- Clade: Tracheophytes
- Clade: Angiosperms
- Clade: Monocots
- Order: Asparagales
- Family: Amaryllidaceae
- Subfamily: Allioideae
- Genus: Allium
- Subgenus: A. subg. Nectaroscordum
- Species: A. siculum

Binomial name
- Allium siculum Ucria

Synonyms
- Synonymy: Allium bulgaricum (Janka) Prodán; Nectaroscordum siculum (Ucria) Lindl.; Nothoscordum siculum (Ucria) auct., published anonymously; Trigonea sicula (Ucria) Parl.; Nectaroscordum bulgaricum Janka; Allium meliophilum Juz.; Nectaroscordum meliophilum (Juz.) Stank.; Allium dioscoridis Sm.; Nectaroscordum dioscoridis (Sm.) Stankov

= Allium siculum =

Honey garlic

Species of flowering plant

Allium siculum (syn. Nectaroscordum siculum), known as honey garlic, Sicilian honey lily, Sicilian honey garlic, or Mediterranean bells, is a species of plant in the genus Allium. Native to parts of Europe and the Middle East, the species is grown commercially as an ornamental and culinary herb.

== Description ==
It has showy clusters of gracefully drooping bell-shaped blossoms produced in May to early June sitting atop a tall green stem, up to 1.2 metres (3.9 ft) in height. The florets (blossoms), suspended on long drooping pedicels, are cream colored with a maroon streak down each petal, have white flared tips, and are tinted green at the base. The blossoms are followed by decorative, erect seed pods in late summer. The blue-gray foliage is triangular in cross-section and strongly twisting along the length of the ascending leaves. A penetrating, sulfuric odor is released when any part of this plant is cut or handled.

== Distribution and habitat ==
Allium siculum is native to Turkey, Iran, Crimea, Greece, Bulgaria, Romania, southern France including Corsica, and Italy (Basilicata, Abruzzo, Umbria, Toscana, Sicily, Sardinia), growing in damp, shady woodland areas.

== Taxonomy ==
Allium siculum is a member of the Allium subgenus Nectaroscordum, which consists of only this species and Allium tripedale.

A. siculum itself comprises two subspecies:

- Allium siculum subsp. dioscoridis (Sm.) K.Richt. (Syn. Allium bulgaricum (Janka) Prodán, Allium dioscoridis Sm., Allium meliophilum Juz.,Nectaroscordum bulgaricum Janka, Nectaroscordum dioscoridis Sm., Nectaroscordum meliophilum (Juz.) Stank., Nectaroscordum siculum subsp. bulgaricum (Janka) Stearn) - native to Greece, Turkey, Bulgaria, Romania, Crimea, introduced in Great Britain
- Allium siculum subsp. siculum - native to France (including Corsica) and Italy (including Sardinia and Sicily)

== Uses ==
=== Ornamental ===
Allium siculum is grown as an ornamental in flower gardens. It has showy, drooping blossoms, with each umbel (clusters of flowers on stalks originating in the same place) having up to 30 individual flowers, which are white, pink, and green in colour. Although the flowers initially face downwards, they turn to face upwards just before forming seedheads. It also has unusual twisted foliage. Unlike the majority of other Allium species, A. siculum grows well in shade.

=== Culinary ===
In Bulgaria, the leaves of Allium siculum subsp. dioscoridis, which is known by the vernacular names 'samardala' and 'Bulgarian honey garlic', are used in the preparation of traditional spice mixes.

== Chemistry ==
The lachrymatory agent (Z)-butanethial S-oxide, along with several 1-butenyl thiosulfinates have been detected in crushed plant material by mass spectrometry using a DART ion source. (Z)-Butanethial S-oxide (the higher homolog of syn-propanethial-S-oxide, the onion lachrymatory agent) isolated from the plant was shown to be identical to a synthetic sample. The precursor to the active lachrymatory compound, (R_{S},R_{C})-(E)-S-(1-butenyl) cysteine S-oxide (homoisoalliin), was isolated from A. siculum, and a closely related species, Allium tripedale, and fully characterized.

A. siculum is unpalatable to grazing animals such as deer and, akin to garlic (Allium sativum), may be toxic to cats and dogs, likely owing to the sulfur compounds discussed above.
