= S-oxide =

Enantiomers of brugierol, an S-oxide derivative of an organic disulfide.

In organosulfur chemistry, S-oxide may refer to:

- S-oxides of disulfides, compounds with the linkage RSS(O)R. Several 1,2-dithiolanes form S-oxides.
- S-oxides of thioketones and thioaldehydes, compounds with the formula R_{2}C=S=O and RCH=S=O, respectively. syn-Propanethial-S-oxide, a lacrymatory component of onion, is one example.
- sulfoxides, compounds with the formula R_{2}SO, are sometimes referred to as S-oxides. Methionine-S-oxide reductase illustrates this nomenclature.

Sulfur oxide refers to inorganic compounds with the formula SO_{x}, especially sulfur dioxide and sulfur trioxide.
