= Sulfenic acid =

Organosulfur compound and oxoacid

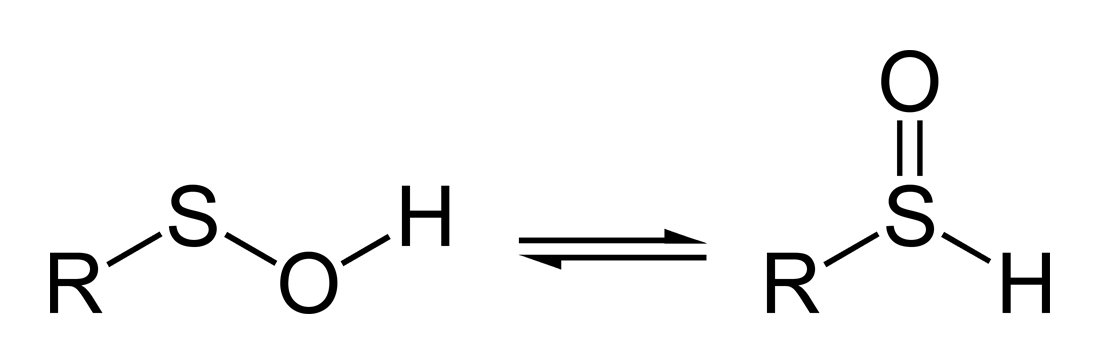
While sulfenic acids have the potential of exhibiting tautomerism, spectroscopic measurements as well as theoretical studies indicate that the structure on the left predominates almost exclusively.

In chemistry, a sulfenic acid is an organosulfur compound and oxoacid with the general formula R−S−OH. They are organosulfur oxoacids, which means compounds attached to sulfur of the grouping SO_{x}H. Related compounds are sulfinic acids (R−S(=O)OH) and sulfonic acids (R−S(=O)_{2}OH).

== Properties ==
In contrast to sulfinic and sulfonic acids, simple sulfenic acids, such as methanesulfenic acid, CH_{3}SOH, are highly reactive and cannot be isolated in solution. In the gas phase the lifetime of methanesulfenic acid is about one minute. The gas phase structure of methanesulfenic acid was found by microwave spectroscopy (rotational spectroscopy) to be CH_{3}–S–O–H. Sulfenic acids can be stabilized through steric effects, which prevent the sulfenic acid from condensing with itself to form thiosulfinates, RS(O)SR, such as allicin from garlic. Through the use of X-ray crystallography, the structure of such stabilized sulfenic acids were shown to be R–S–O–H. The stable, sterically hindered sulfenic acid 1-triptycenesulfenic acid has been found to have a pK_{a} of 12.5 and an O–H bond-dissociation energy (bde) of 71.9 ± 0.3 kcal/mol, which can be compared to a pK_{a} of ≥14 and O–H BDE of ~88 kcal/mol for the (valence) isoelectronic hydroperoxides, ROOH.

== Formation and occurrence ==
=== Peroxiredoxins ===
Peroxiredoxins are ubiquitous and abundant enzymes that detoxify peroxides. They function by the conversion of a cysteine residue to a sulfenic acid. The sulfenic acid then converts to a disulfide by reaction with another residue of cysteine.

=== Garlic and onions ===
Sulfenic acids are produced by the enzymatic decomposition of alliin and related compounds following tissue damage to garlic, onions, and other plants of the genus Allium. 1-Propenesulfenic acid, (E)-CH_{3}CH=CH−S−OH, formed when onions are cut, is rapidly rearranged by a second enzyme, the lachrymatory factor synthase, giving syn-propanethial-S-oxide, (Z)-CH_{3}CH_{2}CH=S^{+}−O^{−}. 2-Propenesulfenic acid, CH_{2}=CHCH_{2}−S−OH, formed from allicin, is thought to be responsible for garlic's potent antioxidant activity. Mass spectrometry with a DART ion source were used to identify 2-propenesulfenic formed when garlic is cut or crushed and to demonstrate that this sulfenic acid has a lifetime of less than one second. The pharmacological activity of certain drugs, such as omeprazole, esomeprazole, ticlopidine, clopidogrel, and prasugrel is proposed to involve sulfenic acid intermediates. Oxidation of cysteine residues in protein to the corresponding protein sulfenic acids, a post-translational modification known as S-sulfenylation, is suggested to be important in redox-mediated signal transduction.

Sulfenic acid forms part of the series of chemical reactions that occur when cutting onions. The lachrymal glands are irritated by the end product of the reactions, syn-Propanethial-S-oxide, causing tears.

=== Organic and inorganic chemistry ===
Dioctadecyl 3,3'-thiodipropanoate: oxidation and E_{i} elimination gives a polymer stabilizer against long-term heat ageing

The base member of the sulfenic acid series is the inorganic compound hydrogen thioperoxide. With the formula HSOH, it is very labile.

Sulfoxides can undergo thermal elimination via an E_{i} mechanism to yield vinyl alkenes and sulfenic acids:

RS(O)CH_{2}CH_{2}R' → RSOH + CH_{2}=CHR'

Compounds which react in this manner are used as polymer stabilizers, The thiodipropionate esters are popular in commerce.

Sulfenate-based ligands are found at the active site of the nitrile hydratases. The S=O group is proposed as the nucleophile that attacks the nitrile.

Sulfenic acids are potent physiological electrophiles; they react rapidly with thiols to form disulfides and with hydrogen sulfide to produce hydropersulfides. As mentioned above, they self-condense to form thiosulfinates. Selective detection of protein sulfenic acids in biological samples can be achieved with dimedone-based reagents, which are not nucleophilic enough to react with other cysteine modifications such as disulfides and hydropersulfides.

== Other sulfenyl compounds ==
The prefix sulfenyl in organic nomenclature denotes the RS group (R ≠ H). One example is methanesulfenyl chloride, CH_{3}SCl.

Sulfenate esters have the formula RSOR′. They arise by the reaction of sulfenyl chlorides on alcohols. Sulfenate esters are intermediates in the Mislow-Evans rearrangement of allyl sulfoxides. Sulfenamides have the formula RSNR′_{2}.
