= Pentathiepane =

- Isomers of pentathiepane: 1,2,3,4,5- (left), 1,2,3,4,6- (center), and 1,2,3,5,6-pentathiapane (right)

Identifiers
CAS Number	1,2,3,4,5: 88870-99-9; 1,2,3,5,6: 292-46-6
3D model (JSmol)	1,2,3,4,5: Interactive image; 1,2,3,4,6: Interactive image; 1,2,3,5,6: Interactive image
ChEBI	1,2,3,4,5: CHEBI:38541; 1,2,3,4,6: CHEBI:38543; 1,2,3,5,6: CHEBI:6408
ChEMBL	1,2,3,5,6: ChEMBL4288485
ChemSpider	1,2,3,4,5: 16099197; 1,2,3,4,6: 16099169
KEGG	1,2,3,5,6: C08382
PubChem CID	1,2,3,4,5: 16126807; 1,2,3,4,6: 16126810; 1,2,3,5,6: 67521
UNII	1,2,3,5,6: 71G9U1CIRD
CompTox Dashboard (EPA)	1,2,3,4,5: DTXSID501313754; 1,2,3,5,6: DTXSID20183460
- InChI: 1,2,3,4,5: InChI=1S/C2H4S5/c1-2-4-6-7-5-3-1/h1-2H2 Key: RBTUCNGNEMKWGJ-UHFFFAOYSA-N; 1,2,3,4,6: InChI=1S/C2H4S5/c1-3-2-5-7-6-4-1/h1-2H2 Key: VUWWZQBBXCOVBJ-UHFFFAOYSA-N; 1,2,3,5,6: InChI=1S/C2H4S5/c1-3-4-2-6-7-5-1/h1-2H2 Key: DZKOKXZNCDGVRY-UHFFFAOYSA-N
- SMILES: 1,2,3,4,5: C1CSSSSS1; 1,2,3,4,6: C1SCSSSS1; 1,2,3,5,6: C1SSCSSS1

Properties
Chemical formula	C_{2}H_{4}S_{5}
Molar mass	188.35 g·mol^{−1}
- Except where otherwise noted, data are given for materials in their standard state (at 25 °C [77 °F], 100 kPa). Infobox references

Pentathiepanes are organosulfur compounds and sulfur heterocycles with the formula (CH_{2})_{2}S_{5}. Three isomers exist depending on the location of the C atoms in the ring. These compounds are uncommon except for the 1,4-derivative, which is called lenthionine. It contributes to the aroma of shiitake mushroooms.

More common than the pentathiepanes are pentathiepines, which have a C=C bond in the ring. Only one isomer exists for this class of rings.
