= Lenthionine =

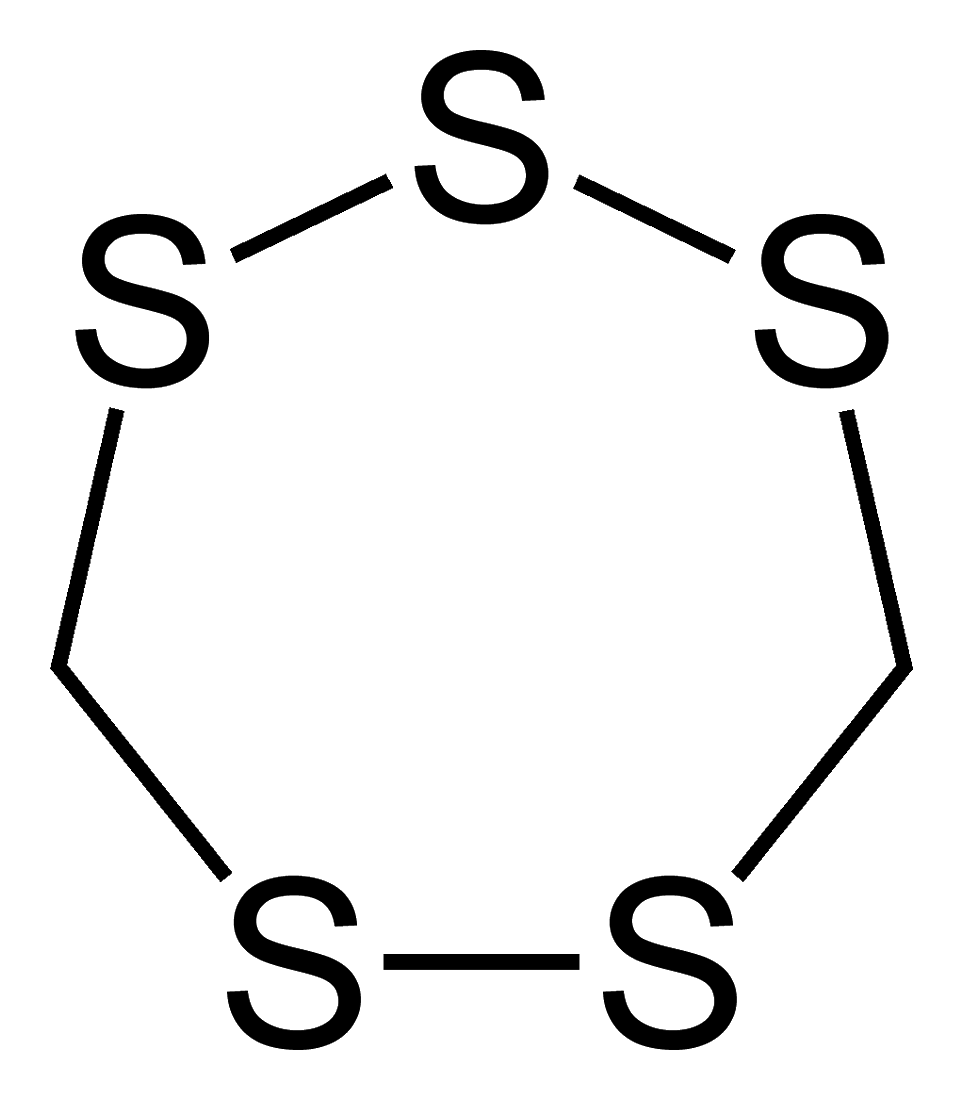
Skeletal structure of lenthionine
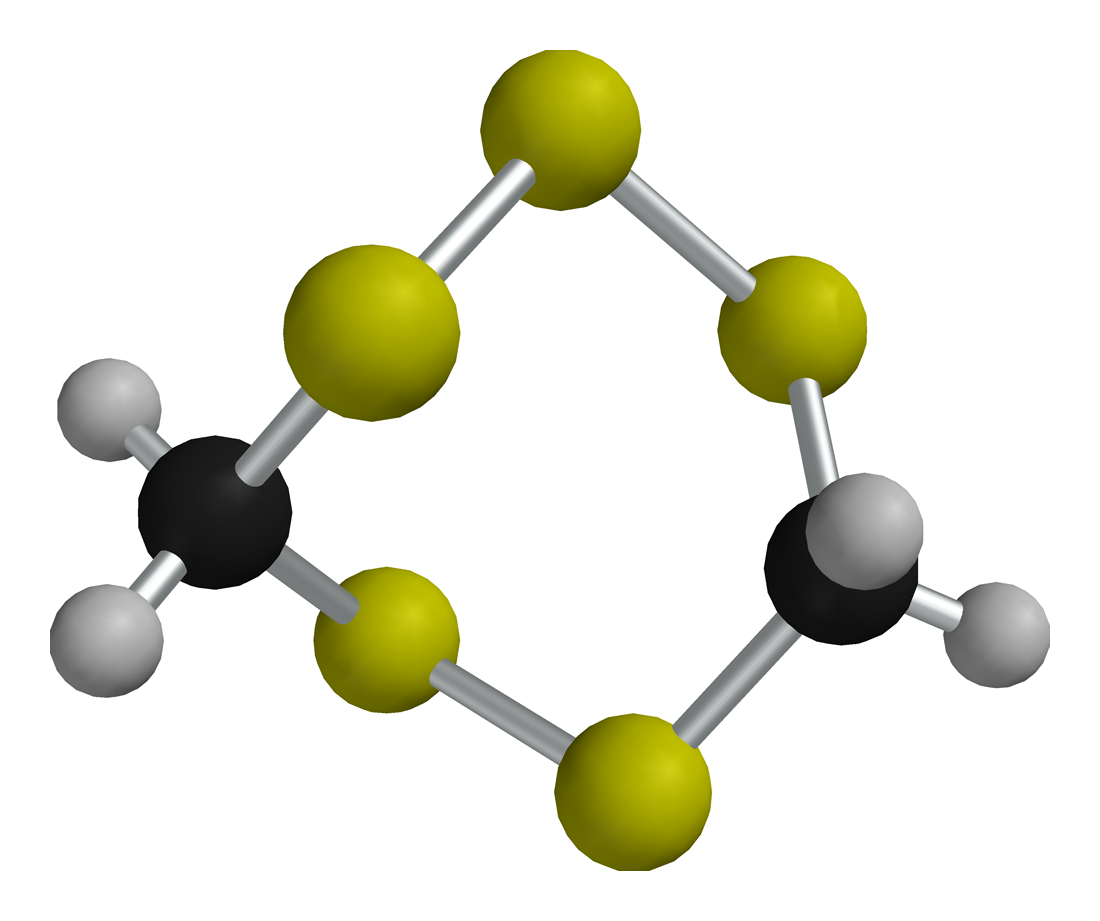
3D structure of lenthionine

Names
- Preferred IUPAC name 1,2,3,5,6-Pentathiepane
- Other names 1,2,3,5,6-Pentathiacycloheptane; 1,4-Dicarbacycloheptasulfane

Identifiers
CAS Number	292-46-6
3D model (JSmol)	Interactive image
ChEBI	CHEBI:6408
ChemSpider	60844
KEGG	C08382
PubChem CID	67521
UNII	71G9U1CIRD
CompTox Dashboard (EPA)	DTXSID20183460
- InChI: InChI=1S/C2H4S5/c1-3-4-2-6-7-5-1/h1-2H2 Key: DZKOKXZNCDGVRY-UHFFFAOYSA-N; InChI=1/C2H4S5/c1-3-4-2-6-7-5-1/h1-2H2 Key: DZKOKXZNCDGVRY-UHFFFAOYAF
- SMILES: C1SSCSSS1

Properties
Chemical formula	(CH_{2})_{2}S_{5}
Molar mass	188.35 g·mol^{−1}
Density	1.549 g/cm^{3}
Melting point	60.5 °C (140.9 °F; 333.6 K)
Boiling point	287 °C (549 °F; 560 K)
Solubility in water	532.7 mg/L
log P	4.238
- Except where otherwise noted, data are given for materials in their standard state (at 25 °C [77 °F], 100 kPa). verify (what is ?) Infobox references

Lenthionine is an organosulfur compound with the formula (CH_{2})_{2}S_{5}. The compound consists of a 1,4-C_{2}S_{5} ring (pentathiepane). Lenthionine is a major component of the organosulfur compounds found in shiitake mushrooms (Lentinula edodes), onions, and garlic, and it is partly responsible for their flavor. The mechanism of its formation is unclear, but it likely involves the enzyme C–S lyase.

== Preparation ==
Lenthionine has been prepared by treating dichloromethane with polysulfide solutions.
