= Chester John Cavallito =

American organic chemist

- Born: May 7, 1915
- Died: March 28, 2010 (aged 94)
- Citizenship: United States
- Education: Ph.D. Ohio State University
- Known for: Work on chemistry of garlic
- Scientific career
- Fields: Organic chemistry

Chester J. Cavallito (May 7, 1915 – March 28, 2010) was an American organic chemist. He was particularly known for his work on the chemistry of garlic. Beginning in 1944, with his colleagues, he reported on the isolation from crushed garlic, synthesis (from diallyl disulfide) and antibiotic activity of a compound he named allicin. Cavallito established that allicin was a member of a class of organosulfur compounds known as thiosulfinates. He also synthesized and reported on the chemical and biological properties of a series of thiosulfinates related to allicin.

== Education, employment and professional activities ==
Cavallito earned a B.Sc. in chemistry from Rutgers University in 1936 and a Ph.D. in organic and physiological chemistry from Ohio State University in 1940. From 1942 to 1950 Cavallito was a research group leader at Sterling Winthrop Research Institute in Rensselaer, New York, where his research on garlic was performed. From 1966 to 1970, Cavallito was professor and chairman of medicinal chemistry at the UNC Eshelman School of Pharmacy. He also served as vice president and director of research at Neisler Laboratories (1952–1966) and executive vice president of scientific affairs, Ayerst Division of American Home Products (1970–1978). Among his other professional activities, Cavallito was president, Academy of Pharmaceutical Sciences, A.Ph.A; chairman, medicinal chemistry section of Academy of the Pharmaceutical Sciences, and secretary and chairman, division of medicinal chemistry of the American Chemical Society.
