= C6H11NO3S =

The molecular formula C_{6}H_{11}NO_{3}S (molar mass: 177.22 g/mol, exact mass: 177.0460 u) may refer to:

- Alliin
- N-Formylmethionine (fMet)
