= Alliinase =

Class of enzyme

alliin lyase

Identifiers
- EC no.: 4.4.1.4
- CAS no.: 9031-77-0

Databases
- BRENDA: enzyme data
- ExPASy: NiceZyme view
- KEGG: enzyme entry
- MetaCyc: metabolic pathway
- Rhea: reactions
- PDB structures: RCSB PDB PDBe PDBsum
- Gene Ontology: AmiGO / QuickGO
Search
- PMC: articles
- PubMed: articles
- NCBI: proteins

Alliinase_C
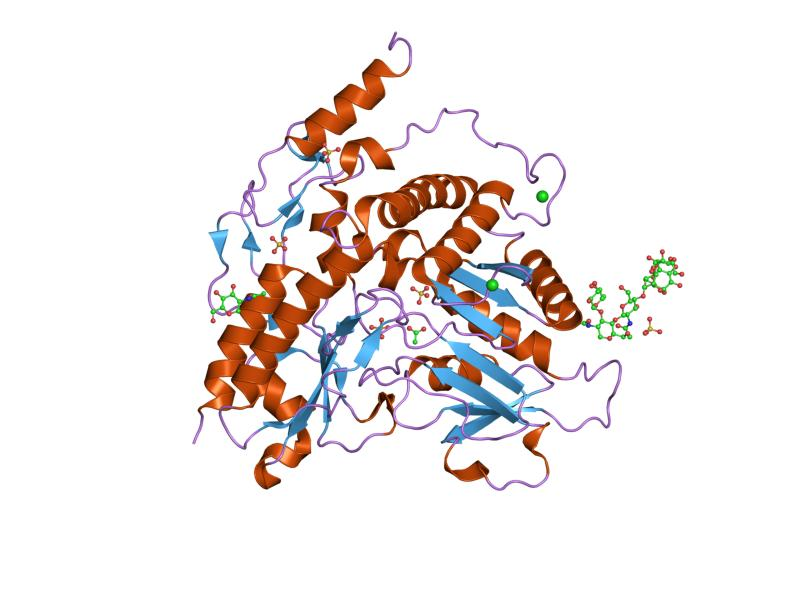
- Crystal structure of alliinase from garlic- apo form

Identifiers
- Symbol: Alliinase_C
- Pfam: PF04864
- Pfam clan: CL0061
- InterPro: IPR006948
- SCOP2: 1lk9 / SCOPe / SUPFAM
Available protein structures:
- PDB: IPR006948 PF04864 (ECOD; PDBsum)
- AlphaFold: IPR006948; PF04864

Alliinase EGF-like domain
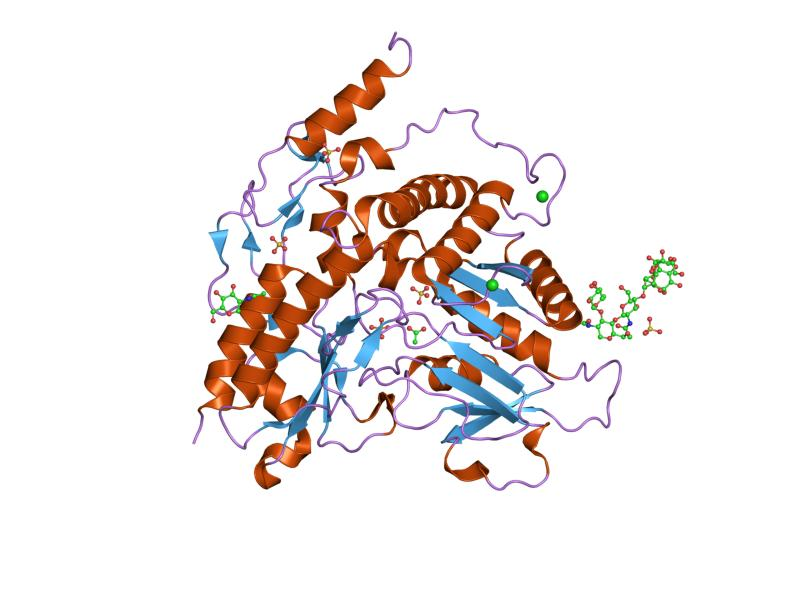
- Crystal structure of alliinase from garlic- apo form

Identifiers
- Symbol: EGF_alliinase
- Pfam: PF04863
- Pfam clan: CL0001
- InterPro: IPR006947
- SCOP2: 1lk9 / SCOPe / SUPFAM
Available protein structures:
- PDB: IPR006947 PF04863 (ECOD; PDBsum)
- AlphaFold: IPR006947; PF04863

In enzymology, an alliin lyase (EC 4.4.1.4) is an enzyme that catalyzes the chemical reaction

an S-alkyl-L-cysteine S-oxide $\rightleftharpoons$ an alkyl sulfenate + 2-aminoacrylate

Hence, this enzyme has one substrate, 2 molecules of an S-alkyl-L-cysteine S-oxide, and two products, 1 molecule each of a alkyl sulfenate and 2-aminoacrylate. The prototypical example is conversion of alliin into allicin, hence the name. This enzyme is a carbon-sulfur lyase (it breaks a C-S bond).

This enzyme is found in plants of the genus Allium, such as garlic and onions. Alliinase is responsible for catalyzing chemical reactions that produce the volatile chemicals that give these foods their flavors, odors, and tear-inducing properties.

The systematic name of this enzyme class is S-alkyl-L-cysteine S-oxide alkyl-sulfenate-lyase (2-aminoacrylate-forming). Other names in common use include alliinase, cysteine sulfoxide lyase, alkylcysteine sulfoxide lyase, S-alkylcysteine sulfoxide lyase, L-cysteine sulfoxide lyase, S-alkyl-L-cysteine sulfoxide lyase, and alliin alkyl-sulfenate-lyase. It employs one cofactor, pyridoxal phosphate (the active form of vitamin B6).

== Biological function ==
Alliinases are part of the plant's defense against herbivores. Alliinase is normally sequestered within a plant cell, but, when the plant is damaged by a feeding animal, the alliinase is released to catalyze the production of the pungent chemicals. This tends to have a deterrent effect on the animal. The same reaction occurs when onion or garlic is cut with a knife in the kitchen.

== Chemistry ==
In garlic, an alliinase enzyme acts on the chemical alliin (S-allyl-L-cysteine S-oxide; R = allyl) (Note: Allyl (CH_{2}=CH−CH_{2}−S−) is prop-1-ene-2-yl, also known as propene-3-yl.) converting it into allicin. The process involves two stages:

- Elimination of 2-propenesulfenic acid (allylsulfenic acid, (CH_{2}=CH−CH_{2}−S−SOH) from alliin, with dehydroalanine (2-aminoacrylate) as a byproduct；
- Condensation of two of the sulfenic acid molecules to give allicin (CH_{2}=CH−CH_{2}S−S−CH_{2}−CH−CH_{2}).

Reaction scheme for the conversion: alliin → 2-propenesulfenic acid (allylsulfenic acid) → allicin

Alliin and related substrates found in nature are chiral at the sulfoxide position (usually having the S absolute configuration, and alliin itself was the first natural product found to have both carbon- and sulfur-centered stereochemistry. However, the sulfenic acid intermediate is not chiral, and the final product's stereochemistry is not controlled.

Allinases can react with many kinds of cysteine-derived sulfoxides present in different species of Allium, not just alliin. Isoalliin ({R = (E)-CH_{3}CH=CH−S−) and methiin (R = methyl) are found in both garlic and onion while propiin (R = propyl) is found in the onion. Each of these produce a corresponding propenesulfenic acid R−SOH, which can condensate with an identical molecule or with each other to form a variety of thiosulfinates similar to allicin (R−S(O)−S−R').

Another possible conversion of R−SOH is rearrangement by lachrymatory factor synthase (LFS, EC 5.3.99.12) into a sulfine. This is observed in onions in the reaction sequence isoalliin → 1-propenesulfenic acid [(E)-CH_{3}CH=CH−S−OH] → syn-propanethial-S-oxide [(Z)-CH_{3}CH_{2}−CH=S^{+}−O^{−}], producing a potent tear gas. The analogous syn-butanethial-S-oxide [(Z)-CH_{3}CH_{2}CH_{2}−CH=S^{+}−O^{−}] is found in Allium siculum species.

== Structural studies ==
As of late 2007, three structures have been solved for this class of enzymes, using X-ray crystallography. The PDB accession codes are PDB: 1LK9, PDB: 2HOR, and PDB: 2HOX.

Many alliinases contain a novel N-terminal epidermal growth factor-like domain (EGF-like domain).

== Bibliography ==
- Durbin RD, Uchytil TF (1971). "Purification and properties of alliin lyase from the fungus Penicillium corymbiferum". Biochimica et Biophysica Acta (BBA) - Enzymology. 235 (3): 518–520. doi:10.1016/0005-2744(71)90293-2.
- Goryachenkova, E. V. (1952). "Фермент в чесноке, который формирует allycine (allyinase), белок с phosphopyridoxal" [Enzyme in garlic which forms allycine (allyinase), a protein with phosphopyridoxal]. Doklady Akademii Nauk SSSR (in Russian). 87: 457–460.
- Jacobsen JV, Yamaguchi M, Howard FD, Bernhard RA (1968). "Product inhibition of the cysteine sulfoxide lyase of tulbaghia violacea". Arch. Biochem. Biophys. 127: 252–258. doi:10.1016/0003-9861(68)90223-3.
