= Allistatin =

Chemical compounds

Allistatin is the collective name for two chemicals, allistatin I and allistatin II, which may be found in garlic. There is no conclusive evidence of its existence, or the existence of the related compound garlicin. It is a sulfur-free chemical and plays an active role within garlic. It is most likely a flavonoid.

There is no experimental evidence of the structure of allistatin; some studies claim it is similar to cyanidin, while others found it shared similarities with garlicin (but not allicin).
