= Sulfonyl nitrene =

Generic chemical structure of a sulfonyl nitrene

A sulfonyl nitrene is a chemical compound with generic formula RSO_{2}N. Known sulfonyl nitrenes include methyl sulfonyl nitrene, trifluoromethyl sulfonyl nitrene, and tolyl sulfonyl nitrene. Also fluorosulfonyl nitrene FSO_{2}N exists, but rearranges to FNSO_{2}. Preparation of sulfonyl nitrenes can be accomplished by heating sulfonyl azides:

RSO_{2}N_{3} → RSO_{2}N + N_{2}

They are distinct from sulfinyl nitrenes which only have one oxygen attached to the sulfur atom.
