= Varacin =

- Varacin skeletal structure

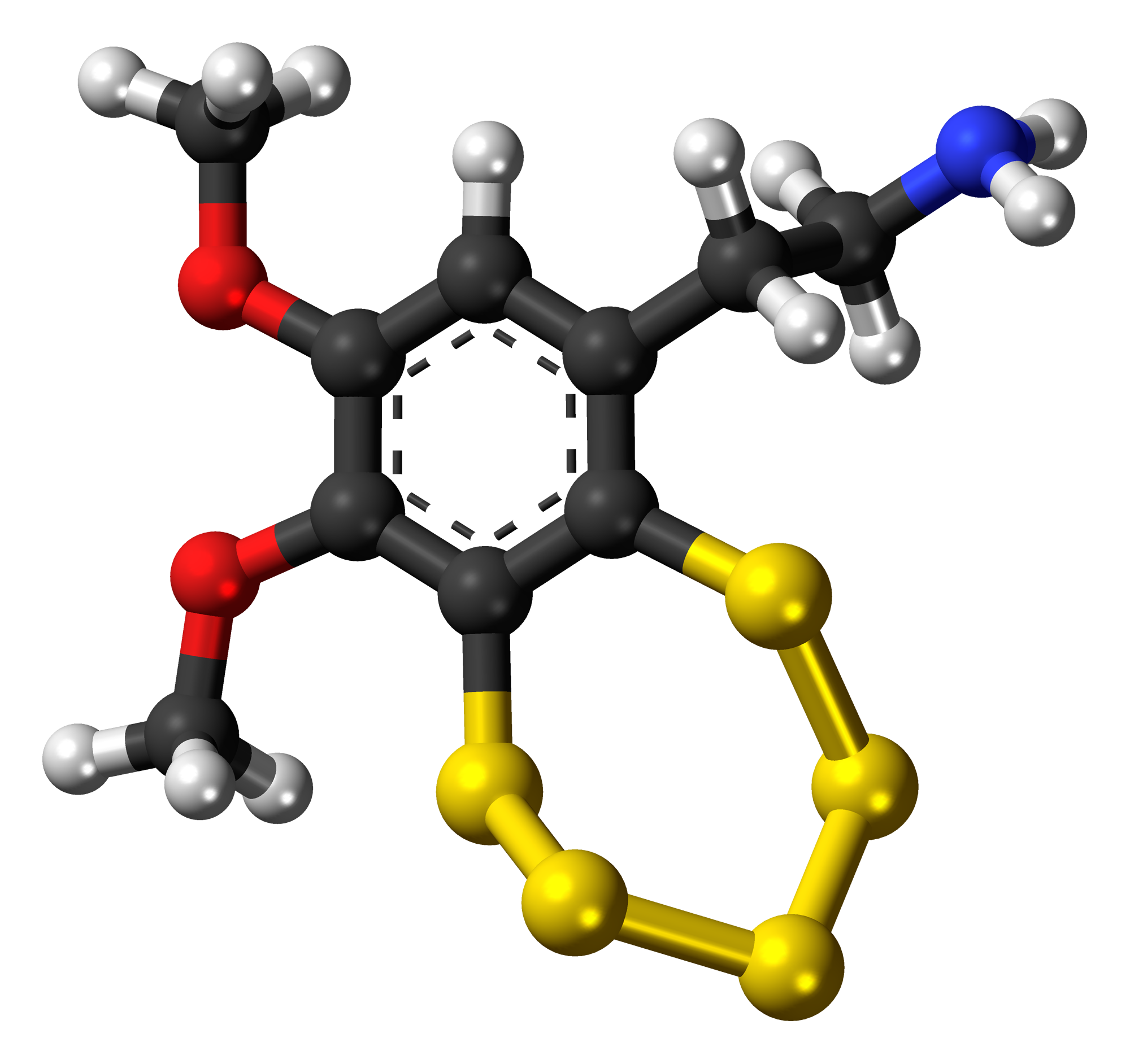

Names
- Preferred IUPAC name 2-(8,9-Dimethoxy-1,2,3,4,5-benzopentathiepin-6-yl)ethan-1-amine

Identifiers
CAS Number	134029-48-4
3D model (JSmol)	Interactive image
ChEMBL	ChEMBL151233
ChemSpider	156044
PubChem CID	179269
UNII	85V98E6A3M
CompTox Dashboard (EPA)	DTXSID10158465
- InChI: InChI=1S/C10H13NO2S5/c1-12-7-5-6(3-4-11)9-10(8(7)13-2)15-17-18-16-14-9/h5H,3-4,11H2,1-2H3 Key: HIKCOAGMCNIBMP-UHFFFAOYSA-N; InChI=1/C10H13NO2S5/c1-12-7-5-6(3-4-11)9-10(8(7)13-2)15-17-18-16-14-9/h5H,3-4,11H2,1-2H3 Key: HIKCOAGMCNIBMP-UHFFFAOYAP
- SMILES: NCCc2cc(OC)c(OC)c1SSSSSc12

Properties
Chemical formula	C_{10}H_{13}NO_{2}S_{5}
Molar mass	339.540 g/mol
- Except where otherwise noted, data are given for materials in their standard state (at 25 °C [77 °F], 100 kPa). verify (what is ?) Infobox references

Varacin is a bicyclic organosulfur compound originally found in marine Ascidiacea from the Polycitor genus. It contains an unusual 1,2,3,4,5-benzopentathiepine ring system.

== Bioactivity ==
The compound reacts with DNA. Synthetic analogues have been investigated for their antimicrobial and antitumour properties. Because of its potent biological activity and unusual and challenging ring system, it has been a popular target of efforts toward its total synthesis.

Varacin and a few related polysulfur natural products potentially exhibit planar chirality.
