= Dioxalin =

Names
- IUPAC name 5-(Hydroxymethyl)-1,4-dioxane-2,3-dione

Identifiers
3D model (JSmol)	Interactive image
ChemSpider	129557678
PubChem CID	139033612
CompTox Dashboard (EPA)	DTXSID801045843
- InChI: InChI=1S/C5H6O5/c6-1-3-2-9-4(7)5(8)10-3/h3,6H,1-2H2 Key: LLQXEQGCIRCAQO-UHFFFAOYSA-N
- SMILES: OCC1COC(=O)C(=O)O1

Properties
Chemical formula	C_{5}H_{6}O_{5}
Molar mass	146.098 g·mol^{−1}
- Except where otherwise noted, data are given for materials in their standard state (at 25 °C [77 °F], 100 kPa). Infobox references

Dioxalin is a reaction product of glycerol with oxalic acid at 533 K. Its IUPAC name is 5-(hydroxymethyl)-1,4-dioxane-2,3-dione. Dioxalin readily loses two molecules of carbon dioxide at this high temperature to form allyl alcohol and therefore offers a method for conversion of glycerol to allyl alcohol.
