= 3-Mercapto-1-propanol =

Organosulfur compound with the molecular formula C3H8OS

Names
- IUPAC name 3-sulfanylpropan-1-ol

Identifiers
CAS Number	19721-22-3
3D model (JSmol)	Interactive image
ChEMBL	ChEMBL3234722
ChemSpider	79578
ECHA InfoCard	100.156.181
EC Number	627-858-4
PubChem CID	88211
UNII	WY6F8YVC7Z
CompTox Dashboard (EPA)	DTXSID3051836
- InChI: InChI=1S/C3H8OS/c4-2-1-3-5/h4-5H,1-3H2 Key: SHLSSLVZXJBVHE-UHFFFAOYSA-N
- SMILES: OCCCS

Properties
Chemical formula	C_{3}H_{8}OS
Molar mass	92.16 g·mol^{−1}
Appearance	colorless
Odor	pungent, sulfurous
Density	1.067 g/mL at 20 °C
Boiling point	81–82 °C (178–180 °F; 354–355 K) (10 mmHg)
Refractive index (n_{D})	1.495

Hazards
- GHS labelling
Pictograms	(GHS06: Toxic)
Signal word	Danger
Hazard statements	H301, H311
Precautionary statements	P262, P264, P270, P280, P301+P316, P302+P352, P316, P321, P330, P361+P364, P405, P501
Flash point	85 °C (185 °F; 358 K) (closed cup)
- Except where otherwise noted, data are given for materials in their standard state (at 25 °C [77 °F], 100 kPa). Infobox references

3-Mercapto-1-propanol, also known as 3-sulfanylpropan-1-ol or 3-mercaptopropan-1-ol, is an organosulfur compound with the molecular formula C_{3}H_{8}OS. It is a member of the class of compounds known as mercapto alcohols. Its thiol and hydroxyl groups influence its chemical properties. Thiols can react with oxygen to form disulfides and can also participate in reactions with various electrophilic compounds, while the hydroxyl group can take part in reactions typical of alcohols.

== Applications ==
3-Mercapto-1-propanol is used primarily as a reagent and molecular linker in chemical synthesis and materials science. Because the molecule contains both a thiol group and a hydroxyl group, it is frequently employed to create hydrophilic self-assembled monolayers on metal surfaces, a process essential for the development of biosensors and microfluidic devices. In organic synthesis, the compound serves as an intermediate and functions as a clean-cleaving linker in the production of complex oligosaccharides and pharmaceuticals.

Additionally, 3-mercapto-1-propanol is used in small concentrations as a flavoring agent, due to its unique odor.
