= 2,3-sigmatropic rearrangement =

Class of chemical reaction

2,3-Sigmatropic rearrangements are a type of sigmatropic rearrangements and can be classified into two types. Rearrangements of allylic sulfoxides, amine oxides, selenoxides are neutral. Rearrangements of carbanions of allyl ethers are anionic. The general scheme for this kind of rearrangement is:

Atom Y may be sulfur, selenium, or nitrogen. If Y is nitrogen, the reaction is referred to as the Sommelet–Hauser rearrangement if a quaternary ammonium salt is involved or the aza-Wittig reaction if an alpha-metalated tertiary amine is involved; if Y is oxygen, then it is called a 2,3-Wittig rearrangement (not to be confused with the well-known Wittig reaction, which involves a phosphonium ylide). If Y is sulfur, the product can be treated with a thiophil to generate an allylic alcohol in what is known as the Mislow–Evans rearrangement.

A [2,3]-rearrangement may result in carbon-carbon bond formation. It can also be used as a ring-expansion reaction.

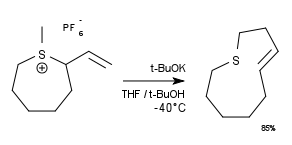

== Stereoselectivity ==
2,3-sigmatropic rearrangements can offer high stereoselectivity. At the newly formed double bond there is a strong preference for formation of the E-alkene or trans isomer product. The stereochemistry of the newly formed C-C bond is harder to predict. It can be inferred from the five-membered ring transition state. Generally, the E-alkene will favor the formation of anti product, while Z-alkene will favor formation of syn product.

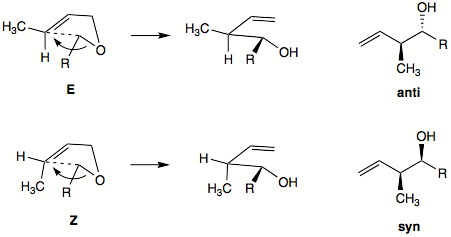

Diastereoselectivity can be high for Z-alkene with alkynyl, alkenyl, or aryl anion-stabilizing group. Diastereoselectivity is usually lower with E-alkenes. Hydrocarbon groups will prefer exo orientation in the envelope-like transition state. Anion-stabilizing group will prefer the endo orientation in transition state.
