= Diallyl trisulfide =

Names
- Preferred IUPAC name Di(prop-2-en-1-yl)trisulfane
- Other names Allitridin

Identifiers
CAS Number	2050-87-5
3D model (JSmol)	Interactive image
ChEBI	CHEBI:78492
ChemSpider	15481
ECHA InfoCard	100.016.462
EC Number	218-107-8
PubChem CID	16315
UNII	0ZO1U5A3XX
CompTox Dashboard (EPA)	DTXSID9045972
- InChI: InChI=1S/C6H10S3/c1-3-5-7-9-8-6-4-2/h3-4H,1-2,5-6H2 Key: UBAXRAHSPKWNCX-UHFFFAOYSA-N; InChI=1/C6H10S3/c1-3-5-7-9-8-6-4-2/h3-4H,1-2,5-6H2 Key: UBAXRAHSPKWNCX-UHFFFAOYAC
- SMILES: C=CCSSSCC=C

Properties
Chemical formula	C_{6}H_{10}S_{3}
Molar mass	178.33 g·mol^{−1}
- Except where otherwise noted, data are given for materials in their standard state (at 25 °C [77 °F], 100 kPa). Infobox references

Diallyl trisulfide (DATS), also known as Allitridin, is an organosulfur compound with the formula S(SCH_{2}CH=CH_{2})_{2}. It is one of several compounds produced by hydrolysis of allicin, including diallyl disulfide and diallyl tetrasulfide; DATS is one of the most potent.

== Biological applications ==
DATS has been shown to selectively kill cancerous cells in the prostate and breast, leaving healthy cells unharmed. This effect is attributed to increased reactive oxygen species (ROS) within cancer cells, increased the number of cells that arrest in the G2 phase of mitosis, and promote an increase in caspase-3 activity. These effects appear to contribute to the apoptosis of cancer cells and a decrease in cancer cell proliferation.

DATS can be metabolized by glutathione in red blood cells to form hydrogen sulfide (H2S). This conversion occurs at a consistent rate over a prolonged period of time, rendering DATS a good source of H2S. H2S is a cardioprotective agent that has antioxidant, anti-inflammatory, and anti-apoptotic effects. A major topic of research is the impact of hydrogen sulfide on reducing myocardial ischemia-reperfusion injury. Reperfusion injury is a significant threat to myocardial function that arises with the reintroduction of blood flow to the heart following an ischemic episode. Reperfusion triggers an inflammatory response and often results in oxidative damage. H2S decreases injury through many different effects such a decrease in oxidative stress, maintenance of mitochondrial function, and increased eNOS (endothelial nitric oxide synthase) activation. eNOS is activated via phosphorylation by H2S through the activation of the PI3K/Akt pathway, which increases the formation and bioavailability of nitric oxide (NO). This negatively impacts mitochondria functionality. The mitochondria has been known to protect the heart from ischemic-reperfusion injury through the opening of the ATP-sensitive K+ channel. This causes vasodilation and improves hemodynamics.

DATS is a promising treatment for cardiac arrhythmias through its ability to change the opening of the human ether-à-go-go-related (hERG) channel. hERG is the pore-forming subunit of potassium channels that create delayed rectifier potassium ion currents in many cells, including cardiac myocytes. The delayed rectifier potassium ion current is largely responsible for the repolarization of ventricular cardiac myocytes by permitting potassium efflux. DATS causes a decrease in the steady-state inactivation, alters deactivation, and impairs trafficking of the hERG channel from the endoplasmic reticulum to the plasma membrane of the cell. This decreases the amount of functional potassium ion rectifier channels on the cell membrane and thus, slows depolarization. However, hERG trafficking impairment has also been shown to cause arrhythmias due to the development of long QT syndrome and should be considered in drug development.
