= Allium tripedale =

Scientific classification
- Kingdom: Plantae
- Clade: Tracheophytes
- Clade: Angiosperms
- Clade: Monocots
- Order: Asparagales
- Family: Amaryllidaceae
- Subfamily: Allioideae
- Genus: Allium
- Subgenus: A. subg. Nectaroscordum
- Species: A. tripedale

Binomial name
- Allium tripedale Trautv.

Synonyms
- Synonymy: Allium roseum subsp. persicum Bornm.; Nectaroscordum persicum (Bornm.) Bornm.; Nectaroscordum tripedale (Trautv.) Traub

Species of flowering plant

Allium tripedale is a species of wild onion native to the Caucasus (North + South), Iraq, Turkey, and northern Iran. It is related to Allium siculum. It produces up to 30 pink-violet bell-shaped flowers per umbel.
