= Cysteine-S-conjugate beta-lyase =

cysteine-S-conjugate β-lyase

Identifiers
- EC no.: 4.4.1.13
- CAS no.: 68652-57-3

Databases
- IntEnz: IntEnz view
- BRENDA: BRENDA entry
- ExPASy: NiceZyme view
- KEGG: KEGG entry
- MetaCyc: metabolic pathway
- PRIAM: profile
- PDB structures: RCSB PDB PDBe PDBsum
- Gene Ontology: AmiGO / QuickGO
Search
- PMC: articles
- PubMed: articles
- NCBI: proteins

The enzyme cysteine-S-conjugate β-lyase (EC 4.4.1.13) catalyzes the chemical reaction

an L-cysteine-S-conjugate + H_{2}O = a thiol + NH_{3} + pyruvate (overall reaction)

(1a) an L-cysteine-S-conjugate = a thiol + 2-aminoprop-2-enoate
(1b) 2-aminoprop-2-enoate = 2-iminopropanoate (spontaneous)
(1c) 2-iminopropanoate + H_{2}O = pyruvate + NH_{3} (spontaneous)

This enzyme belongs to the family of lyases, specifically the class of carbon-sulfur lyases. The systematic name of this enzyme class is L-cysteine-S-conjugate thiol-lyase (deaminating; pyruvate-forming). Other names in common use include cysteine conjugate β-lyase, glutamine transaminase K/cysteine conjugate β-lyase, and L-cysteine-S-conjugate thiol-lyase (deaminating). It employs one cofactor, pyridoxal phosphate.

== Structural studies ==
As of late 2007, 3 structures have been solved for this class of enzymes, with PDB accession codes 1W7L, 1W7M, and 1W7N.
