= Sulfinyl nitrene =

Generic chemical structure of a sulfinyl nitrene

A sulfinyl nitrene is a chemical compound with generic formula R-S(O)N, with oxygen and nitrogen both bonded to the sulfur atom.

== Preparation ==
Sulfinyl nitrenes can be generated from the unstable sulfinyl azides (R-SON_{3}). However this reaction easily results in explosions and unpredictable results.

Sulfinyl nitrenes can be prepared from a sulfinylhydroxylamine, with R–O–N=S=O, by a reaction with an organometallic M-R_{1} compound to yield R_{1}SON.

== Properties ==
Sulfinyl nitrenes are electrophilic.

Sulfinyl nitrenes have a resonance structure between sulfur in a +6 oxidation state and a triple bond to nitrogen, or sulfur with a +4 state, nitrogen in +1 state and a single bond, or a positive charge on sulfur and a negative charge on nitrogen with a double bond. The dominant state is the singlet state with charge separation and a double bond.

== Reactions ==
Sulfinyl nitrenes are unstable and react with themselves to yield sulfonyl nitrenes, disulfides or polymerise to trioxotrithiztriazes.

The reaction with water yields a sulfonylamide (R-SO_{2}NH_{2}.

The reaction of a sulfinyl nitrene with sulfoxides results in a sulfonyl sulfoximde, with the oxygen joining the sulfinyl sulfur and its bond replaced by a double bond to nitrogen.

== Examples ==
Trifluoromethyl sulfinyl nitrene (CF_{3}S(O)N) has been produced as a gas, and isolated in a noble gas matrix.

Methoxysulfinyl nitrene (CH_{3}OS(O)N) was also produced by decomposing the azide.

== Related ==
Sulfinyl nitrenes are distinct from sulfonyl nitrenes which have two oxygen atoms attached to the sulfur atom.

Thiazate or thionylimide ([NSO]^{−}) is an anion that exists as alkali metal salts. They can be formed by a tri-tert-butoxy metal reaction with a trimethylsilyl compound:

KO^{t}Bu + Me_{3}SiNSO → K[NSO] + Me_{3}SiO^{t}Bu

NaNSO, KNSO, RbNSO, CsNSO, (Me_{2}N)_{3}S^{+}NSO^{−} and tris(dimethylamino)sulfonium [(Me_{2}N)_{3}S][NSO] salts are known.
