= Syn-Propanethial-S-oxide =

syn-Propanethial S-oxide

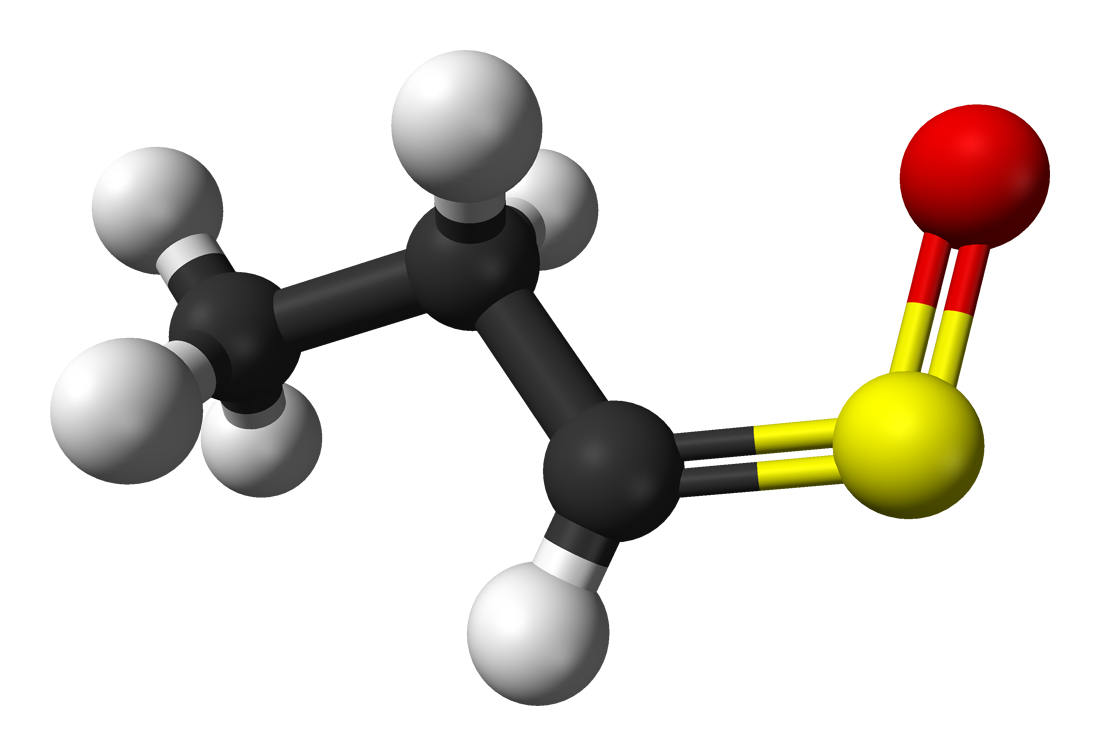

Names
- IUPAC name (Z)-propylidene-λ^{4}-sulfanone
- Other names Thiopropanal S-oxide; 1-Sulfinylpropane

Identifiers
CAS Number	32157-29-2
3D model (JSmol)	Interactive image
ChemSpider	390214
PubChem CID	441491
UNII	94Z73U61UH
CompTox Dashboard (EPA)	DTXSID50954029
- InChI: InChI=1S/C3H6OS/c1-2-3-5-4/h3H,2H2,1H3 Key: BAZSXBOAXJLRNH-UHFFFAOYSA-N; InChI=1/C3H6OS/c1-2-3-5-4/h3H,2H2,1H3 Key: BAZSXBOAXJLRNH-UHFFFAOYAF
- SMILES: O=S=C/CC

Properties
Chemical formula	C_{3}H_{6}OS
Molar mass	90.14 g·mol^{−1}
- Except where otherwise noted, data are given for materials in their standard state (at 25 °C [77 °F], 100 kPa). verify (what is ?) Infobox references

syn-Propanethial S-oxide (or (Z)-propanethial S-oxide), a member of a class of organosulfur compounds known as thiocarbonyl S-oxides (formerly "sulfines"), is a volatile liquid that acts as a lachrymatory agent (triggers tearing and stinging on contact with the eyes). The chemical is released from onions, Allium cepa, as they are sliced.

== Onion release ==
The release from onions is due to the breaking open of the onion cells, which releases enzymes called alliinases. Alliinases then break down amino acid sulfoxides, generating sulfenic acids. Isoalliin is specifically converted to 1-propenesulfenic acid (E)-CH_{3}CH=CH−S−OH by allinase. This product is rearranged by lachrymatory factor synthase (LFS, EC 5.3.99.12) to give syn-propanethial S-oxide (Z)-CH_{3}CH_{2}−CH=S^{+}−O^{−}. Vapors from this volatile liquid induce tearing.

== Related compounds ==
Structure of trans-3,4-diethyl-1,2-dithietane 1,1-dioxide

Propanethial S-oxide forms a stable dimer, trans-3,4-diethyl-1,2-dithietane 1,1-dioxide.

A structurally related lachrymatory compound, syn-butanethial S-oxide, (Z)-CH_{3}CH_{2}CH_{2}−CH=S^{+}−O^{−}, has been found in Allium siculum, a relative of the onion. It is produced via an analogous reaction.

A non-Allium analogue is syn-phenylmethanethial S-oxide (Z)-Ph−CH=S^{+}−O^{−} from Petiveria alliacea. It too undergoes a similar biosynthetic route.
