= S-alkylcysteine lyase =

Identifiers
- EC no.: 4.4.1.6
- CAS no.: 62213-27-8

Databases
- IntEnz: IntEnz view
- BRENDA: BRENDA entry
- ExPASy: NiceZyme view
- KEGG: KEGG entry
- MetaCyc: metabolic pathway
- PRIAM: profile
- PDB structures: RCSB PDB PDBe PDBsum
- Gene Ontology: AmiGO / QuickGO
Search
- PMC: articles
- PubMed: articles
- NCBI: proteins

In enzymology, a S-alkylcysteine lyase (EC 4.4.1.6) is an enzyme that catalyzes the chemical reaction

an S-alkyl-L-cysteine + water $\rightleftharpoons$ an alkyl thiol + ammonia + pyruvate

Thus, the two substrates of this enzyme are S-alkyl-L-cysteine and water, whereas its three products are alkyl thiol, ammonia, and pyruvate.

This enzyme belongs to the family of lyases, specifically the class of carbon-sulfur lyases. The systematic name of this enzyme class is S-alkyl-L-cysteine alkyl-thiol-lyase (deaminating; pyruvate-forming). Other names in common use include S-alkylcysteinase, alkylcysteine lyase, S-alkyl-L-cysteine sulfoxide lyase, S-alkyl-L-cysteine lyase, S-alkyl-L-cysteinase, alkyl cysteine lyase, and S-alkyl-L-cysteine alkylthiol-lyase (deaminating). It employs one cofactor, pyridoxal phosphate.
