= Mislow–Evans rearrangement =

Reaction in organic chemistry

The Mislow–Evans rearrangement is a name reaction in organic chemistry. It is named after Kurt Mislow who reported the prototypical reaction in 1966, and David A. Evans who published further developments.

== General reaction scheme ==
The reaction allows the formation of allylic alcohols from allylic sulfoxides by a 2,3-sigmatropic rearrangement. The conversion can be highly diastereoselective as the chirality at sulfur atom can be transmitted to the carbon next to the oxygen in the product.

Mislow-Evans-ÜbersichtsreaktionV2

The sulfoxide 1 reagent can be generated easily and enantioselectively from the corresponding sulfide by an oxidation reaction. In this reaction various organic groups can be used, R^{1} = alkyl, allyl and R^{2} = alkyl, aryl or benzyl

== Mechanism ==
A proposed mechanism is shown below:

Reaktionsmechanismus Mislow-Evans-Umlagerung

The mechanism starts with an allylic sulfoxide 1 which undergoes a thermal 2,3-sigmatropic rearrangement to give a sulfenate ester 2. This can be cleaved using a thiophile, such as phosphite ester, which leaves the allylic alcohol 3 as the product.

== Scope ==
The reaction has general application in the preparation of trans-allylic alcohols. Douglass Taber used the Mislow–Evans rearrangement in the synthesis of the hormone prostaglandin E2.
