= Allyl propyl disulfide =

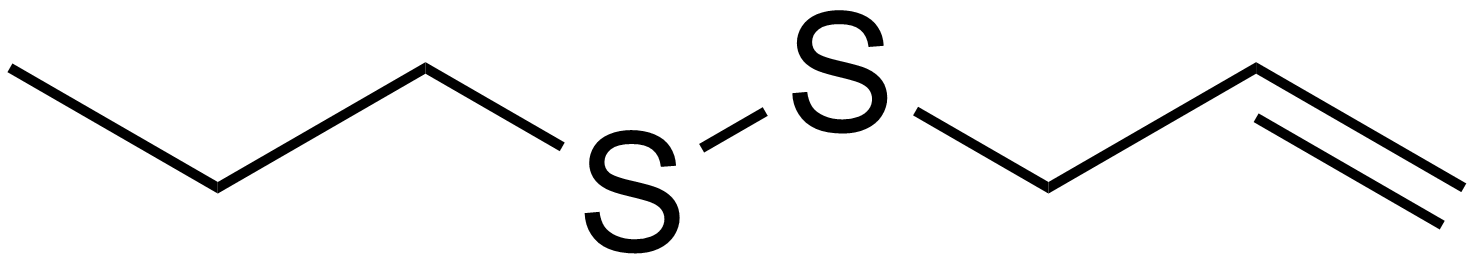

Names
- Preferred IUPAC name 3-(Propyldisulfanyl)prop-1-ene
- Other names 2-Propenyl propyl disulphide 4,5-Dithia-1-octene; Onion oil 2-Propenyl propyl disulfide Propyl allyl disulfide 1-Allyl-2-propyldisulfane (not recommended)

Identifiers
CAS Number	2179-59-1
3D model (JSmol)	Interactive image
ChemSpider	15731
ECHA InfoCard	100.016.864
EC Number	218-550-7
PubChem CID	16591
RTECS number	JO0350000
UNII	0167D73R1T
UN number	1993
CompTox Dashboard (EPA)	DTXSID8024448
- InChI: InChI=1S/C6H12S2/c1-3-5-7-8-6-4-2/h3H,1,4-6H2,2H3 Key: FCSSPCOFDUKHPV-UHFFFAOYSA-N; InChI=1/C6H12S2/c1-3-5-7-8-6-4-2/h3H,1,4-6H2,2H3 Key: FCSSPCOFDUKHPV-UHFFFAOYAQ
- SMILES: S(SCCC)CC=C

Properties
Chemical formula	C_{6}H_{12}S_{2}
Appearance	Pale-yellow liquid
Odor	strong onion-like odor
Density	0.984 g/cm^{3}
Melting point	−15 °C; 5 °F; 258 K
Solubility in water	Insoluble

Hazards
- GHS labelling
Pictograms	(GHS07: Exclamation mark)
Signal word	Warning
Hazard statements	H315, H319, H335
Precautionary statements	P261, P264, P271, P280, P302+P352, P304+P340, P305+P351+P338, P312, P321, P332+P313, P337+P313, P362, P403+P233, P405, P501
Flash point	54.4 °C (129.9 °F; 327.5 K)
- NIOSH (US health exposure limits)
PEL (Permissible)	TWA 2 ppm (12 mg/m^{3})
REL (Recommended)	TWA 2 ppm (12 mg/m^{3}); ST 3 ppm (18 mg/m^{3})
IDLH (Immediate danger)	N.D.
- Except where otherwise noted, data are given for materials in their standard state (at 25 °C [77 °F], 100 kPa). verify (what is ?) Infobox references

Allyl propyl disulfide is an organosulfur compound with the chemical formula C_{3}H_{5}S_{2}C_{3}H_{7}. It is a volatile pale-yellow liquid with a strong odor. It is a major component of onion oil and is used in food additives and flavors.

Allyl propyl disulfide is present in garlic and onion. When onion or garlic is sliced, the substance evaporates and causes eyes to irritate. When garlic or onion is cooked, it also evaporates, ridding them of the spicy taste, and leaving a sweet taste.
