= Thiosulfinate =

Functional group

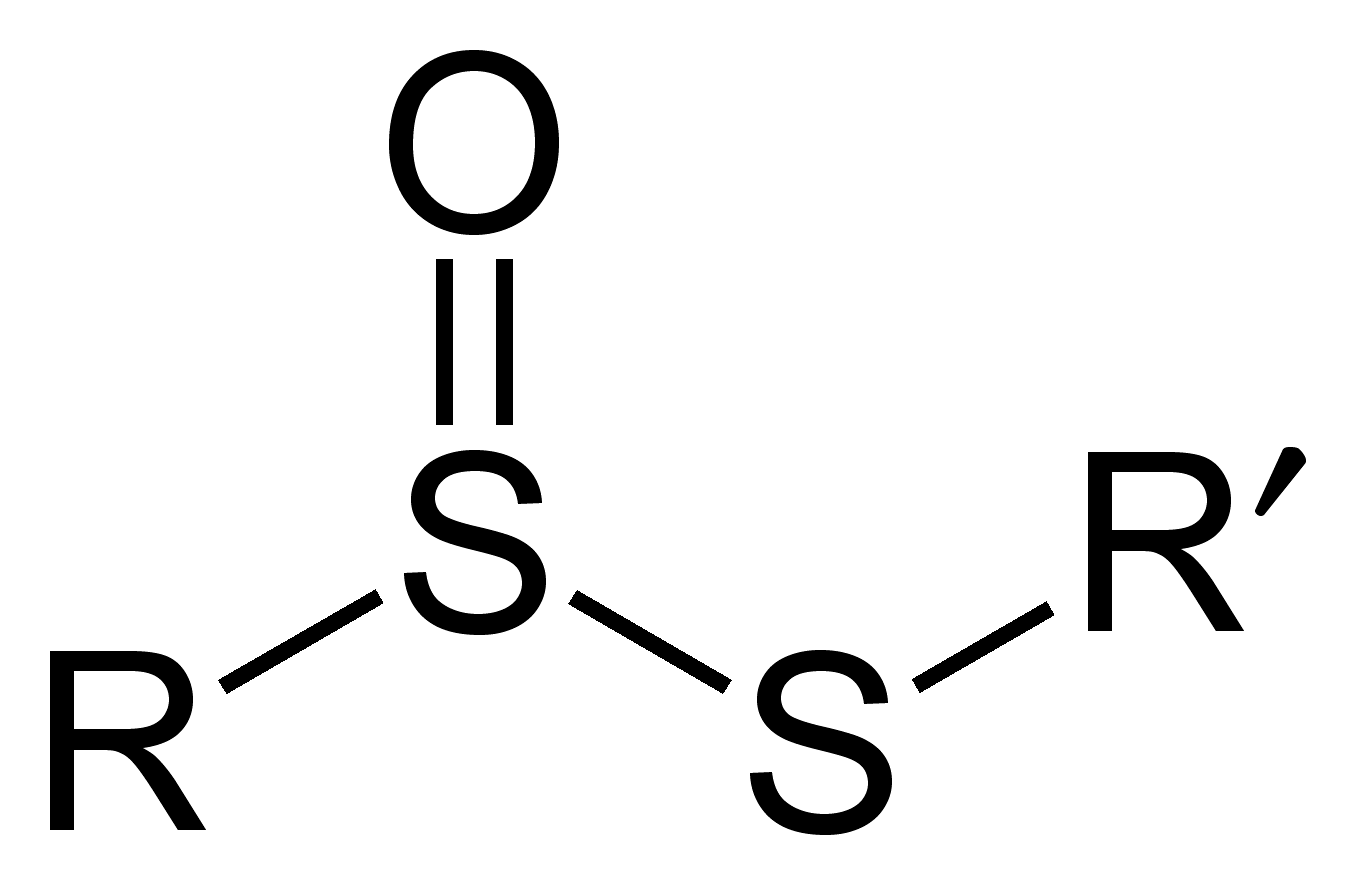
General structure of a thiosulfinate ester, drawn in expanded octet style

In organosulfur chemistry, thiosulfinate is a functional group consisting of the linkage R−S(O)−S−R (R refers to organic substituents). Thiolsulfinates are also named as alkanethiosulfinic (or arenethiosulfinic) acid esters.

They are the first of the series of functional groups containing an oxidized disulfide bond. Other members of this family include thiosulfonates (R−SO_{2}−S−R), α-disulfoxides (R−S(O)−S(O)−R), sulfinyl sulfones (R−S(O)−SO_{2}−R), and α-disulfones (R−SO_{2}−SO_{2}−R), of which all (except α‑disulfoxides) are known. The thiosulfinate group can occur in cyclic as well as acyclic structures.

Thiosulfinate also refers to thiosulfinate anion R−S(O)−S^{−} and its salts.

== Occurrence ==
Allicin

A variety of acyclic and cyclic thiosulfinates are found in plants, or formed when the plants are cut or crushed.

A well-known thiosulfinate is allicin, one of the active ingredients formed when garlic is crushed. Allicin was discovered in 1944 by Chester J. Cavallito and coworkers. Thiosulfinates containing various combinations of the methyl, n-propyl, 1-propenyl, 2-propenyl, n-butyl, 1-butenyl and 2-butenyl groups are formed upon crushing different Allium as well as Brassica species.

Zeylanoxides are cyclic thiosulfinates containing the 1,2-dithiolane-1-oxide ring, isolated from the tropical weed Sphenoclea zeylanica. These heterocyclic thiosulfinates are chiral at carbon as well as at sulfur.

Crushing the roots of Petiveria alliacea affords the thiosulfinates S-(2-hydroxyethyl) 2-hydroxyethane)thiosulfinate, S-(2-hydroxylethyl) phenylmethanethiosulfinate, S-benzyl 2-hydroxyethane)thiosulfinate and S-benzyl phenylmethanethiosulfinate (petivericin; Ph−CH_{2}−S(O)−S−CH_{2}−Ph, Ph = phenyl). Asparagusic acid S-oxide and brugierol are other natural 1,2-dithiolane-1-oxides occurring in Asparagus officinalis and Bruguiera conjugata, respectively.

== Properties ==
Allicin, S-benzyl phenylmethanethiosulfinate, and related thiosulfinates show radical-trapping antioxidant activity associated with easy formation of sulfenic acids The acyclic thiosulfinates from Allium and Brassica species possess antimicrobial, antiparasitic, antitumor and cysteine protease inhibitory activity while the natural 1,2-dithiolane-1-oxides are growth inhibitors. The thiosulfinates from Petiveria also exhibit antimicrobial activity.

Thiosulfinates feature a S(IV) center linked to a S(II) center, the former being stereogenic. Conversion of simple disulfides to thiosulfinates results in a considerable weakening of the S–S bond from about 47.8 to 28.0 kcal mol^{−1} for the S-S bond in PhS(O)SPh and from about 63.2 to 39.3 kcal mol^{−1} for the S-S bond in MeS(O)SMe, with the consequence that most thiosulfinates are both unstable and quite reactive. For this reason the mixtures of thiosulfinates from Allium plants can best be separated by HPLC at room temperature rather than by gas chromatography (GC), although GC has been used with some low molecular weight thiosulfinates. Thiosulfinates can be distinguished from sulfoxides by infrared spectroscopy since they have a characteristic S=O band at about 1078 cm^{−1} compared to 1030–1060 cm^{−1} in sulfoxides.

== Formation and reactions ==
Synthetic thiosulfinates were first reported in 1947 by Cavallito and coworkers by oxidation of the corresponding disulfides.

One example of a moderately stable thiosulfinate is the tert-butyl derivative, (CH_{3})_{3}CS(O)SC(CH_{3})_{3}. This thiosulfinate can be obtained in optical purity by catalytic asymmetric oxidation of di-tert-butyl disulfide with hydrogen peroxide. Upon heating, (CH_{3})_{3}CS(O)SC(CH_{3})_{3} decomposes into tert-butanethiosulfoxylic acid (CH_{3})_{3}CSSOH) as shown by trapping studies.

In a similar manner racemic methyl methanethiosulfinate (CH_{3}S(O)SCH_{3}) can be obtained by peracetic acid oxidation of dimethyl disulfide. Methyl methanethiosulfinate decomposes thermally giving methanesulfenic acid (CH_{3}SOH), the simplest sulfenic acid, as well as thioformaldehyde (CH_{2}=S). Methyl methanethiosulfinate can also disproportionate to a 1:1 mixture of dimethyl disulfide and methyl methanethiosulfonate (CH_{3}SO_{2}SCH_{3}) and rearrange via a Pummerer rearrangement to CH_{3}S(O)CH_{2}SSCH_{3}.

An unusual three-membered ring thiosulfinate (a dithiirane 1-oxide) has been prepared through rearrangement of a 1,3-dithietane. A related compound, 3-(9-triptycyl)dithiirane-1-oxide, was prepared by the reaction of (9-triptycyl)diazomethane and S_{8}O. The X-ray structure of the dithiirane-1-oxide reveals a significantly lengthened sulfur-sulfur bond (211.9(3)pm).

Thiosulfinates have also been invoked as intermediates in the oxidation of thiols to sulfonic acids.
