= Dimethylsulfoxonium methylide =

Organosulfur compound

Names
- IUPAC name Dimethyl-methylidene-oxo-λ^{6}-sulfane
- Other names Corey-Chaykovsky reagent

Identifiers
CAS Number	5367-24-8
3D model (JSmol)	Interactive image; Interactive image
ChemSpider	4910091
PubChem CID	6396768
UNII	7Q604D1T2G
- InChI: InChI=1S/C3H8OS/c1-5(2,3)4/h1H2,2-3H3 Key: DKWOHBPRFZIUQL-UHFFFAOYSA-N
- SMILES: CS(=C)(=O)C; O=[S+](C)([CH2-])C

Properties
Chemical formula	C_{3}H_{8}OS
Molar mass	92.16 g·mol^{−1}
- Except where otherwise noted, data are given for materials in their standard state (at 25 °C [77 °F], 100 kPa). Infobox references

Dimethylsulfoxonium methylide belongs to the group of compounds known as sulfur ylides. It is used in organic synthesis to transfer a methylene group to electrophilic substrates. It can be used to synthesize epoxides and cyclopropanes using the Johnson–Corey–Chaykovsky reaction. Elias James Corey and Michael Chaykovsky first described the compound in 1962. It is commonly made by reacting a trimethylsulfoxonium salt with a strong base.

== Applications ==
Dimethylsulfoxonium methylide is used in synthetic organic chemistry to form small rings and carbon–carbon bonds. Its main uses include epoxide synthesis, cyclopropanation, and the preparation of complex organic molecules.
