= Alliin =

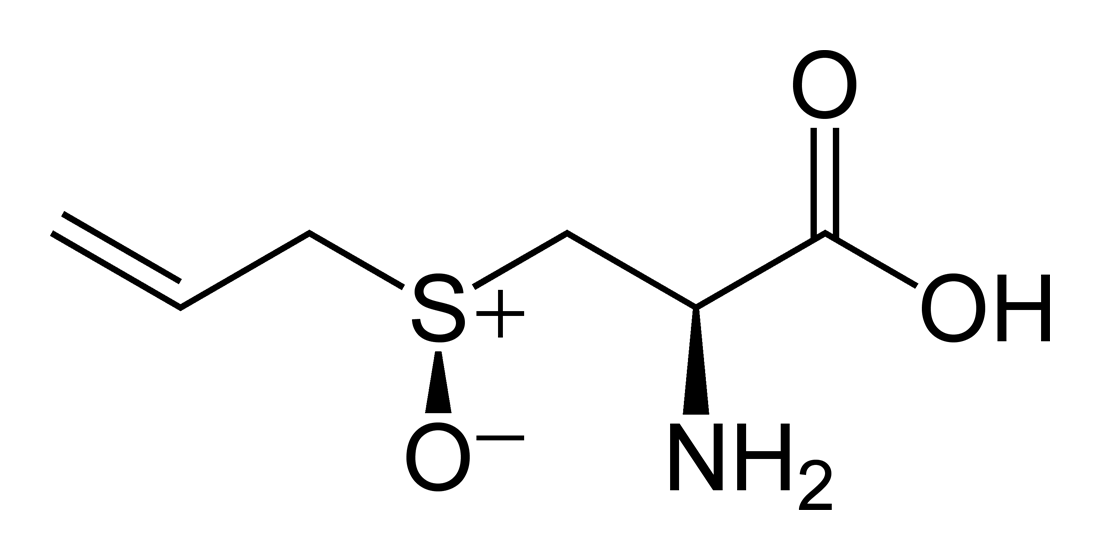
- Alliin skeletal view

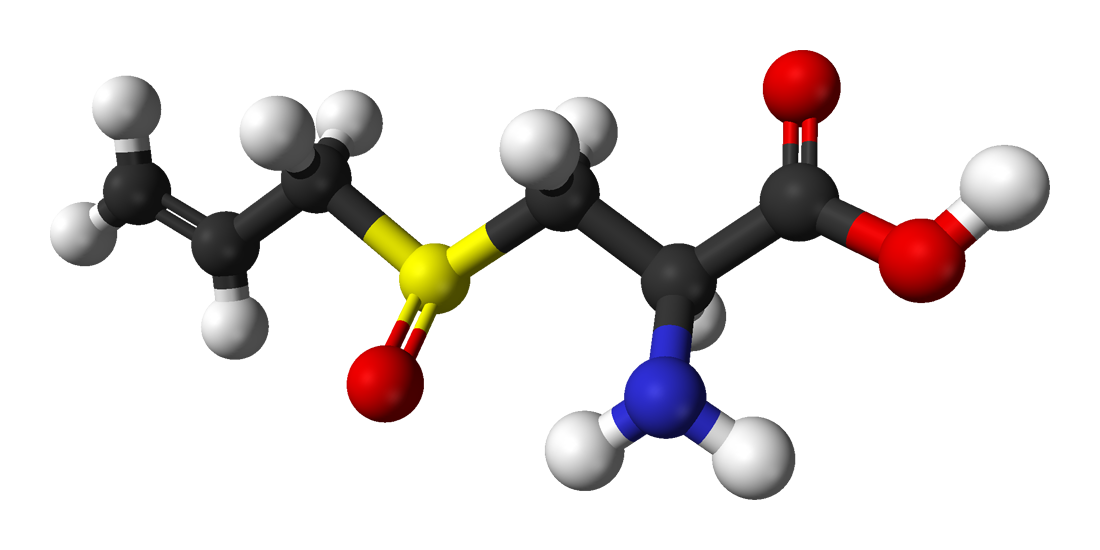
- Alliin ball view

Names
- Systematic IUPAC name (2R)-2-Amino-3-[(S)-(prop-2-ene-1-sulfinyl)]propanoic acid
- Other names 3-(2-Propenylsulfinyl)alanine (S)-3-(2-Propenylsulfinyl)-L-alanine; 3-[(S)-Allylsulfinyl]-L-alanine; S-Allyl-L-cysteine sulfoxide

Identifiers
| CAS Number | 556-27-4 |
| 3D model (JSmol) | Interactive image; Interactive image |
| ChEBI | CHEBI:2596 |
| ChEMBL | ChEMBL464166 |
| ChemSpider | 7850537 |
| ECHA InfoCard | 100.008.291 |
| EC Number | 209-118-9 |
| KEGG | C08265 |
| PubChem CID | 9576089 |
| UNII | 7I4L2D0E9G |
| CompTox Dashboard (EPA) | DTXSID801020639 |
- InChI: InChI=1S/C6H11NO3S/c1-2-3-11(10)4-5(7)6(8)9/h2,5H,1,3-4,7H2,(H,8,9)/t5-,11-/m0/s1 Key: XUHLIQGRKRUKPH-DYEAUMGKSA-N
- SMILES: C=CCS(=O)CC(C(=O)O)N; N[C@H](C(=O)O)C[S@@](=O)CC=C

Properties
| Chemical formula | C_{6}H_{11}NO_{3}S |
| Molar mass | 177.22 g·mol^{−1} |
| Appearance | White to off white crystalline powder |
| Melting point | 163–165 °C (325–329 °F) |
| Solubility in water | Soluble |

Hazards
- GHS labelling
| Pictograms | (GHS07: Exclamation mark) |
| Signal word | Warning |
| Hazard statements | H315, H319, H335 |
| Precautionary statements | P261, P264, P271, P280, P302+P352, P304+P340, P305+P351+P338, P312, P321, P332+P313, P337+P313, P362, P403+P233, P405, P501 |
| NFPA 704 (fire diamond) | 1 1 0 |
| Safety data sheet (SDS) | External MSDS |
- Except where otherwise noted, data are given for materials in their standard state (at 25 °C [77 °F], 100 kPa). verify (what is ?) Infobox references

Alliin /ˈæli.ɪn/ is a sulfoxide that is a natural constituent of fresh garlic. It is a derivative of the amino acid cysteine. When fresh garlic is chopped or crushed, the enzyme alliinase converts alliin into allicin, which is responsible for the aroma of fresh garlic. Allicin and other thiosulfinates in garlic are unstable and form a number of other compounds, such as diallyl sulfide (DAS), diallyl disulfide (DADS) and diallyl trisulfide (DAT), dithiins and ajoene. Garlic powder is not a source of alliin, nor is fresh garlic upon maceration, since the enzymatic conversion to allicin takes place in the order of seconds.

Alliin was the first natural product found to have both carbon- and sulfur-centered stereochemistry.

== Chemical synthesis ==
The first reported synthesis, by Stoll and Seebeck in 1951, begins the alkylation of L-cysteine with allyl bromide to form deoxyalliin. Oxidation of this sulfide with hydrogen peroxide gives both diastereomers of L-alliin, differing in the orientation of the oxygen atom on the sulfur stereocenter.

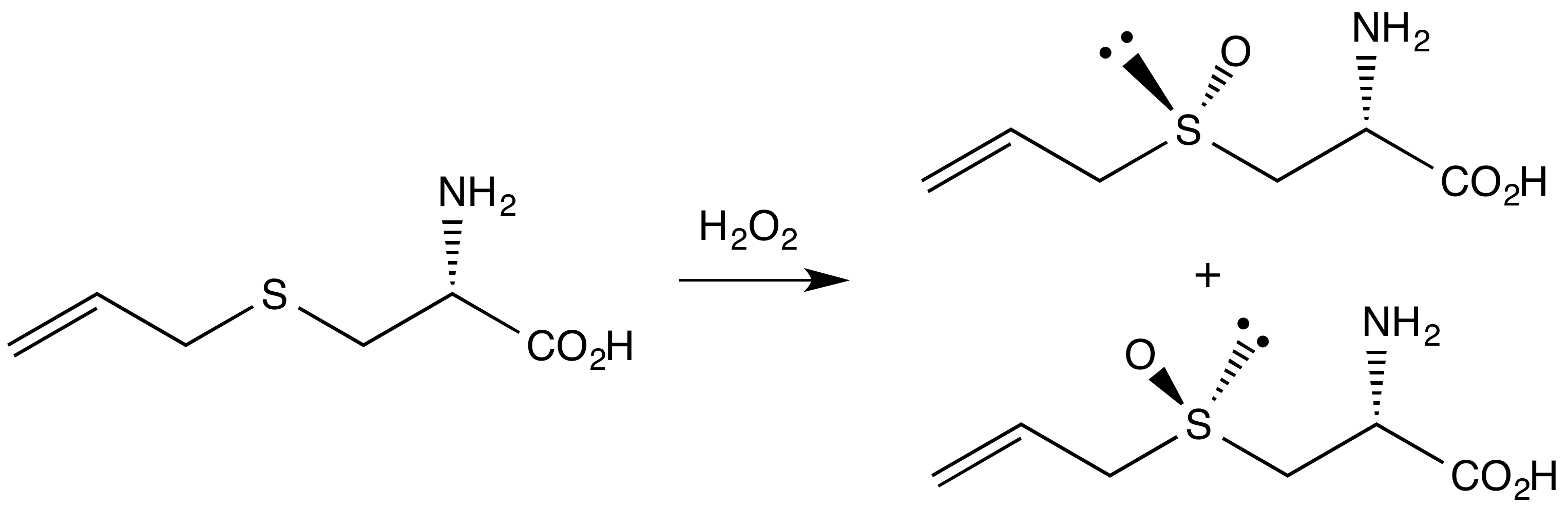

A newer route, reported by Koch and Keusgen in 1998, allows stereospecific oxidation using conditions similar to the Sharpless asymmetric epoxidation. The chiral catalyst is produced from diethyl tartrate and titanium isopropoxide.

== Medical exploration ==
Garlic has been used since antiquity for conditions now associated with oxidative stress (production and accumulation of reactive oxygen species (ROS)). In an in vitro test, garlic powder showed antioxidant properties, and alliin showed good hydroxyl radical-scavenging effect. Alliin has also been found to affect immune responses in blood cells in vitro.
