= Allicin =

- Structural formula of R-allicin

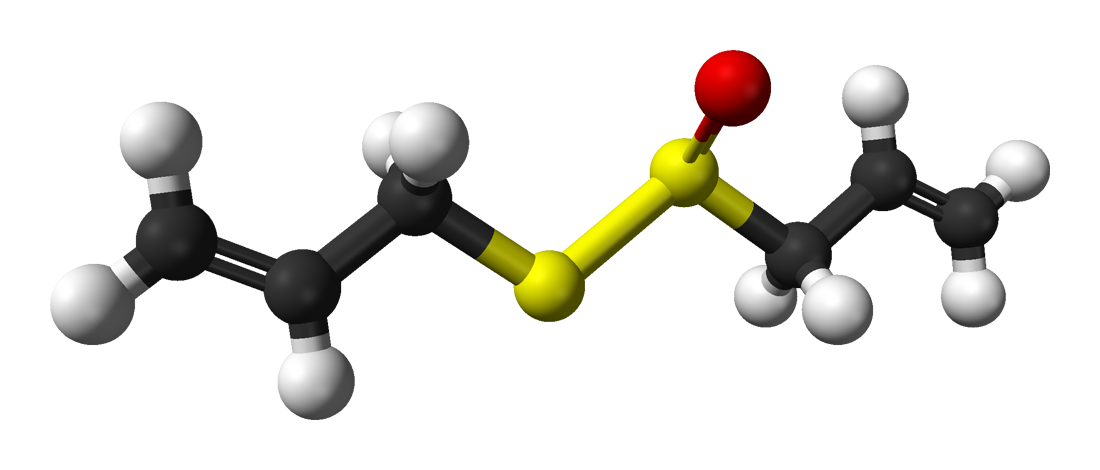
- Ball and stick model of R-allicin

Names
- Preferred IUPAC name S-(Prop-2-en-1-yl) prop-2-ene-1-sulfinothioate
- Other names 2-Propene-1-sulfinothioic acid S-2-propenyl ester 3-[(Prop-2-ene-1-sulfinyl)sulfanyl]prop-1-ene; S-Allyl prop-2-ene-1-sulfinothioate

Identifiers
CAS Number	539-86-6
3D model (JSmol)	Interactive image; Interactive image
Beilstein Reference	1752823
ChEBI	CHEBI:28411
ChEMBL	ChEMBL359965
ChemSpider	58548
ECHA InfoCard	100.007.935
EC Number	208-727-7
IUPHAR/BPS	2419
KEGG	C07600
MeSH	Allicin
PubChem CID	65036
UNII	3C39BY17Y6
CompTox Dashboard (EPA)	DTXSID6043707
- InChI: InChI=1S/C6H10OS2/c1-3-5-8-9(7)6-4-2/h3-4H,1-2,5-6H2 Key: JDLKFOPOAOFWQN-UHFFFAOYSA-N; InChI=1/C6H10OS2/c1-3-5-8-9(7)6-4-2/h3-4H,1-2,5-6H2 Key: JDLKFOPOAOFWQN-UHFFFAOYAO
- SMILES: O=S(SC\C=C)C\C=C; C=CCSS(=O)CC=C

Properties
Chemical formula	C_{6}H_{10}OS_{2}
Molar mass	162.26 g·mol^{−1}
Appearance	Colourless liquid
Density	1.112 g cm^{−3}
Melting point	< 25 °C (77 °F; 298 K)
Boiling point	decomposes
Solubility in water	24 mg/mL (10 °C)

Hazards
- GHS labelling
Pictograms	(GHS07: Exclamation mark)
Signal word	Warning
Hazard statements	H315, H319, H335
Precautionary statements	P261, P264, P264+P265, P271, P280, P302+P352, P304+P340, P305+P351+P338, P319, P321, P332+P317, P337+P317, P362+P364, P403+P233, P405, P501
- Except where otherwise noted, data are given for materials in their standard state (at 25 °C [77 °F], 100 kPa). verify (what is ?) Infobox references

Allicin is an organosulfur compound obtained from garlic and leeks. When fresh garlic is chopped or crushed, the enzyme alliinase converts alliin into allicin, which is responsible for the aroma of fresh garlic. Allicin is unstable and quickly changes into a series of other sulfur-containing compounds such as diallyl disulfide. Allicin is an antifeedant, i.e. the defense mechanism against attacks by pests on the garlic plant.

Allicin is an oily, slightly yellow liquid that gives garlic its distinctive odor. It is a thioester of a sulfinic acid. It is also known as allyl thiosulfinate. Its biological activity can be attributed to both its antioxidant activity and its reaction with thiol-containing proteins.

== Structure and occurrence ==
Allicin features the thiosulfinate functional group, R-S(O)-S-R. The compound is not present in garlic unless tissue damage occurs, and is formed by the action of the enzyme alliinase on alliin. Allicin is chiral but occurs naturally only as a racemate. The racemic form can also be generated by oxidation of diallyl disulfide:

(SCH_{2}CH=CH_{2})_{2} + 2 RCO_{3}H + H_{2}O → 2 CH_{2}=CHCH_{2}SOH + 2 RCO_{2}H
2 CH_{2}=CHCH_{2}SOH → CH_{2}=CHCH_{2}S(O)SCH_{2}CH=CH_{2} + H_{2}O

Alliinase is irreversibly deactivated below pH 3; as such, allicin is generally not produced in the body from the consumption of fresh or powdered garlic. Furthermore, allicin can be unstable, breaking down within 16 hours at 23 °C.

=== Biosynthesis ===
The biosynthesis of allicin commences with the conversion of cysteine into S-allyl-L-cysteine. Oxidation of this thioether gives the sulfoxide (alliin). The enzyme alliinase, which contains pyridoxal phosphate (PLP), cleaves alliin, generating allylsulfenic acid (CH_{2}=CHCH_{2}SOH), pyruvate, and ammonium ions. At room temperature, two molecules of allylsulfenic acid condense to form allicin.

Reaction scheme for the conversion: alliin → 2-propenesulfenic acid (allylsulfenic acid) → allicin

== Research ==
Allicin has been studied for its potential to treat various kinds of multiple drug resistance bacterial infections, as well as viral and fungal infections in vitro, but as of 2016, the safety and efficacy of allicin to treat infections in people was unclear.

A Cochrane review found there to be insufficient clinical evidence regarding the effects of allicin in preventing or treating common cold.

== History ==
It was first isolated and studied in the laboratory by Chester J. Cavallito and John Hays Bailey in 1944. Allicin was discovered as part of efforts to create thiamine derivatives in the 1940s, mainly in Japan. Allicin became a model for medicinal chemistry efforts to create other thiamine disulfides. The results included sulbutiamine, fursultiamine (thiamine tetrahydrofurfuryl disulfide) and benfothiamine. These compounds are hydrophobic, easily pass from the intestines to the bloodstream, and are reduced to thiamine by cysteine or glutathione.

== See also ==
- Allyl isothiocyanate, the active piquant chemical in mustard, radishes, horseradish and wasabi
- syn-Propanethial-S-oxide, the lachrymatory chemical found in onions
- List of phytochemicals in food
