= Organosulfur chemistry =

Organic compounds that contain sulfur

Organosulfur chemistry is the study of the properties and synthesis of organosulfur compounds, which are organic compounds that contain sulfur. They are often associated with foul odors, but many of the sweetest compounds known are organosulfur derivatives, e.g., saccharin. Nature abounds with organosulfur compounds—sulfur is vital for life. Of the 20 common amino acids, two (cysteine and methionine) are organosulfur compounds, and the antibiotics penicillin and sulfa drugs both contain sulfur. While sulfur-containing antibiotics save many lives, sulfur mustard is a deadly chemical warfare agent. Fossil fuels, coal, petroleum, and natural gas, which are derived from ancient organisms, necessarily contain organosulfur compounds, the removal of which is a major focus of oil refineries.

Sulfur shares the chalcogen group with oxygen, selenium, and tellurium, and it is expected that organosulfur compounds have similarities with carbon–oxygen, carbon–selenium, and carbon–tellurium compounds.

A classical chemical test for the detection of sulfur compounds is the Carius halogen method.

== Structural classes ==
Organosulfur compounds can be classified according to the sulfur-containing functional groups, which are listed (approximately) in decreasing order of their occurrence.

Illustrative organosulfur compounds

Allicin, the active flavor compound in crushed garlic

(R)-Cysteine, an amino acid containing a thiol group

Methionine, an amino acid containing a sulfide

Diphenyl disulfide, a representative disulfide

Dibenzothiophene, a component of crude oil

Perfluorooctanesulfonic acid, a controversial surfactant

Lipoic acid, an essential cofactor of four mitochondrial enzyme complexes.

Penicillin core structure, where "R" is the variable group.

Sulfanilamide, a sulfonamide antibacterial, called a sulfa drug.

Sulfur mustard, a type of sulfide used as a chemical warfare agent.

Martin's sulfurane with a see-saw structure, like that of SF_{4}

Dimethylsulfoxonium Methylide is a common sulfur ylide.

=== Sulfides ===
Sulfides, formerly known as thioethers, are characterized by C−S−C bonds Relative to C−C bonds, C−S bonds are both longer, because sulfur atoms are larger than carbon atoms, and about 10% weaker. Representative bond lengths in sulfur compounds are 183 pm for the S−C single bond in methanethiol and 173 pm in thiophene. The C−S bond dissociation energy for thiomethane is 89 kcal/mol (370 kJ/mol) compared to methane's 100 kcal/mol (420 kJ/mol) and when hydrogen is replaced by a methyl group the energy decreases to 73 kcal/mol (305 kJ/mol). The single carbon to oxygen bond is shorter than that of the C−C bond. The bond dissociation energies for dimethyl sulfide and dimethyl ether are respectively 73 and 77 kcal/mol (305 and 322 kJ/mol).

Sulfides are typically prepared by alkylation of thiols. Alkylating agents include not only alkyl halides, but also epoxides, aziridines, and Michael acceptors.

They can also be prepared via the Pummerer rearrangement.

In the Ferrario reaction, phenyl ether is converted to phenoxathiin by action of elemental sulfur and aluminium chloride.

Thioacetals and thioketals feature C−S−C−S−C bond sequence. They represent a subclass of sulfides. The thioacetals are useful in "umpolung" of carbonyl groups. Thioacetals and thioketals can also be used to protect a carbonyl group in organic syntheses.

The above classes of sulfur compounds also exist in saturated and unsaturated heterocyclic structures, often in combination with other heteroatoms, as illustrated by thiiranes, thiirenes, thietanes, thietes, dithietanes, thiolanes, thianes, dithianes, thiepanes, thiepines, thiazoles, isothiazoles, and thiophenes, among others. The latter three compounds represent a special class of sulfur-containing heterocycles that are aromatic. The resonance stabilization of thiophene is 29 kcal/mol (121 kJ/mol) compared to 20 kcal/mol (84 kJ/mol) for the oxygen analogue furan. The reason for this difference is the higher electronegativity for oxygen drawing away electrons to itself at the expense of the aromatic ring current. Yet as an aromatic substituent the thio group is less electron-releasing than the alkoxy group. Dibenzothiophenes (see diagram), tricyclic heterocycles consisting of two benzene rings fused to a central thiophene ring, occurs widely in heavier fractions of petroleum.

=== Thiols, disulfides, polysulfides ===
Thiol groups contain the functionality R−SH. Thiols are structurally similar to the alcohol group, but these functionalities are very different in their chemical properties. Thiols are more nucleophilic, more acidic, and more readily oxidized. This acidity can differ by 5 pK_{a} units.

The difference in electronegativity between sulfur (2.58) and hydrogen (2.20) is small and therefore hydrogen bonding in thiols is not prominent. Aliphatic thiols form monolayers on gold, which are topical in nanotechnology.

Certain aromatic thiols can be accessed through a Herz reaction.

Removal of the hydrogen atom gives a thiyl radical, an unstable reaction intermediate.

Disulfides R−S−S−R with a covalent sulfur to sulfur bond are important for crosslinking: in biochemistry for the folding and stability of some proteins and in polymer chemistry for the crosslinking of rubber.

Longer sulfur chains are also known, such as in the natural product varacin which contains an unusual pentathiepin ring (5-sulfur chain cyclised onto a benzene ring).

=== Inorganic thioesters ===
Esters of thiols with inorganic acids (e.g., Bunte salts, formally from a thiol and sodium hydrogen sulfate) generally have properties deducible from those of thiols and the corresponding acid. Some are, however, of biological interest.

Thiophosphate esters see extensive use in pharmacology and agriculture, as the moiety tends to stall enzymes that hydrolyze phosphates.

S-Nitrosothiols, also known as thionitrites, attach a nitroso group to a thiol, e.g. R−S−N=O. They have received considerable attention in biochemistry because they serve as donors of the nitrosonium ion, NO^{+}, and nitric oxide, NO, which may serve as signaling molecules in living systems, especially related to vasodilation.

=== Thioic acid derivatives ===
Thiocarboxylic acids (RC(O)SH) and dithiocarboxylic acids (RC(S)SH) are well known. They are structurally similar to carboxylic acids but more acidic. Thioesters have general structure R−C(O)−S−R. They are related to regular esters (R−C(O)−O−R) but are more susceptible to hydrolysis and related reactions. Thioesters formed from coenzyme A are prominent in biochemistry, especially in fatty acid synthesis.

Thioamides, with the formula R_{1}C(=S)N(R_{2})R_{3} are more common than thioketones and thioaldehydes. They are typically prepared by the reaction of amides with Lawesson's reagent. Isothiocyanates, with formula R−N=C=S, are found naturally. Vegetable foods with characteristic flavors due to isothiocyanates include wasabi, horseradish, mustard, radish, Brussels sprouts, watercress, nasturtiums, and capers.

Few thioacyl chlorides are stable.

Thiocyanates, R−S−CN, are related to sulfenyl halides and esters in terms of reactivity.

=== Other unsaturated C–S bonding ===
Compounds with double bonds between carbon and sulfur are relatively uncommon, but include the important compounds carbon disulfide, carbonyl sulfide, and thiophosgene. Thioketones (RC(=S)R′) are uncommon with alkyl substituents, but one example is thiobenzophenone. Thioaldehydes are rarer still, reflecting their lack of steric protection ("thioformaldehyde" exists as a cyclic trimer).

The S-oxides of thiocarbonyl compounds are known as thiocarbonyl S-oxides: (R_{2}C=S=O, and thiocarbonyl S,S-dioxides or sulfenes, R_{2}C=SO_{2}). The thione S-oxides have also been known as sulfines, and while IUPAC considers this term obsolete, the name persists in the literature. These compounds are well known with extensive chemistry. Examples include syn-propanethial-S-oxide and sulfene.

Triple bonds between sulfur and carbon in sulfaalkynes are rare and can be found in carbon monosulfide (CS) and have been suggested for the compounds F_{3}CCSF_{3} and F_{5}SCSF_{3}. The unbranched compound HCSOH is also represented as having a formal triple bond.

=== Sulfur halides ===
A wide range of organosulfur compounds are known which contain one or more halogen atom ("X" in the chemical formulas that follow) bonded to a single sulfur atom, e.g.: sulfenyl halides, RSX; sulfinyl halides, RS(O)X; sulfonyl halides, RSO_{2}X; alkyl and arylsulfur trichlorides, RSCl_{3} and trifluorides, RSF_{3}; and alkyl and arylsulfur pentafluorides, RSF_{5}. Less well known are dialkylsulfur tetrahalides, mainly represented by the tetrafluorides, e.g., R_{2}SF_{4}, although at least one difluoride dichloride (R_{2}SF_{2}Cl_{2}) is known.

=== S-oxidized moieties ===
A sulfoxide, R−S(O)−R, is the S-oxide of a sulfide ("sulfide oxide"); a sulfone, R−S(O)_{2}−R, is the S,S-dioxide of a sulfide; a thiosulfinate, R−S(O)−S−R, is the S-oxide of a disulfide; and a thiosulfonate, R−S(O)_{2}−S−R, is the S,S-dioxide of a disulfide. All of these compounds are well known with extensive chemistry, e.g., dimethyl sulfoxide, dimethyl sulfone, and allicin (see drawing).

Sulfonic acids have functionality R−S(=O)_{2}−OH. They are strong acids that are typically soluble in organic solvents. Sulfonic acids like trifluoromethanesulfonic acid is a frequently used reagent in organic chemistry. Sulfinic acids have functionality R−S(O)−OH while sulfenic acids have functionality R−S−OH. In the series sulfonic—sulfinic—sulfenic acids, both the acid strength and stability diminish in that order. Sulfonamides, sulfinamides and sulfenamides, with formulas R−SO_{2}NR′_{2}, R−S(O)NR′_{2}, and R−SNR′_{2}, respectively, each have a rich chemistry. For example, sulfa drugs are sulfonamides derived from aromatic sulfonation. Chiral sulfinamides are used in asymmetric synthesis, while sulfenamides are used extensively in the vulcanization process to assist cross-linking.

=== S-oxidation with nitrogen ===
Sulfimides (also called a sulfilimines) are sulfur–nitrogen compounds of structure R_{2}S^{+}N^{−}R′, the nitrogen analog of sulfoxides. They are of interest in part due to their pharmacological properties. When two different R groups are attached to sulfur, sulfimides are chiral. Sulfimides form stable α-carbanions. Sulfinyl nitrenes, despite their formal resonance structure as R–S(=O)≡N, instead behave primarily as nitrenic sulfinamides.

Sulfoximides (also called sulfoximines) are tetracoordinate sulfur–nitrogen compounds, isoelectronic with sulfones, in which one oxygen atom of the sulfone is replaced by a substituted nitrogen atom, e.g., R_{2}S(O)=NR′. When two different R groups are attached to sulfur, sulfoximides are chiral. Much of the interest in this class of compounds is derived from the discovery that methionine sulfoximide (methionine sulfoximine) is an inhibitor of glutamine synthetase. In Sulfonediimines (also called sulfodiimines, sulfodiimides or sulfonediimides), a nitrogen replaces both sulfone oxygen atoms, e.g., R_{2}S(=NR′)_{2}. They are of interest because of their biological activity and as building blocks for heterocycle synthesis.

Sulfinylamines are bicoordinate sulfur-oxygen-nitrogen compounds, roughly describable as RN=S^{+}–O^{−}.

=== Sulfonium salts and ylides ===
A sulfonium ion is a positively charged ion featuring three organic substituents attached to sulfur, with the formula [R_{3}S]^{+}. Together with their negatively charged counterpart, the anion, the compounds are called sulfonium salts. An oxosulfonium ion is a positively charged ion featuring three organic substituents and an oxygen attached to sulfur, with the formula [R_{3}S=O]^{+}. Together with their negatively charged counterpart, the anion, the compounds are called oxosulfonium salts. Related species include alkoxysulfonium and chlorosulfonium ions, [R_{2}SOR]^{+} and [R_{2}SCl]^{+}, respectively.

Deprotonation of sulfonium and oxosulfonium salts affords ylides, of structure R_{2}S^{+}−C^{−}−R′_{2} and R_{2}S(O)^{+}−C^{−}−R′_{2}. While sulfonium ylides, for instance in the Johnson–Corey–Chaykovsky reaction used to synthesize epoxides, are sometimes drawn with a C=S double bond, e.g., R_{2}S=CR′_{2}, the ylidic carbon–sulfur bond is highly polarized and is better described as being ionic. Sulfonium ylides are key intermediates in the synthetically useful Stevens rearrangement. Thiocarbonyl ylides (RR′C=S^{+}−C^{−}−RR′) can form by ring-opening of thiiranes, photocyclization of aryl vinyl sulfides, as well as by other processes.

=== Sulfuranes and persulfuranes ===
Sulfuranes are relatively specialized functional group that feature tetravalent sulfur, with the formula SR_{4} Likewise, persulfuranes feature hexavalent SR_{6}.

One of the few all-carbon persulfuranes has two methyl and two biphenylene ligands:

It is prepared from the corresponding sulfurane 1 with xenon difluoride / boron trifluoride in acetonitrile to the sulfuranyl dication 2 followed by reaction with methyllithium in tetrahydrofuran to (a stable) persulfurane 3 as the cis isomer. X-ray diffraction shows C−S bond lengths ranging between 189 and 193 pm (longer than the standard bond length) with the central sulfur atom in a distorted octahedral molecular geometry.

== Organosulfur compounds in nature ==
A variety of organosulfur compounds occur in nature. Most abundant are the amino acids methionine, cysteine, and cystine. The vitamins biotin and thiamine, as well as lipoic acid contain sulfur heterocycles. Glutathione is the primary intracellular antioxidant. Penicillin and cephalosporin are life-saving antibiotics, derived from fungi. Gliotoxin is a sulfur-containing mycotoxin produced by several species of fungi under investigation as an antiviral agent.

=== In fossil fuels ===
Common organosulfur compounds present in petroleum fractions at the level of 200–500 ppm. Common compounds are thiophenes, especially dibenzothiophenes. By the process of hydrodesulfurization (HDS) in refineries, these compounds are removed as illustrated by the hydrogenolysis of thiophene: C_{4}H_{4}S + 8 H_{2} → C_{4}H_{10} + H_{2}S

=== Flavor and odor ===
Compounds like allicin and ajoene are responsible for the odor of garlic. Lenthionine contributes to the flavor of shiitake mushrooms. Volatile organosulfur compounds also contribute subtle flavor characteristics to wine, nuts, cheddar cheese, chocolate, coffee, and tropical fruit flavors. Many of these natural products also have important medicinal properties such as preventing platelet aggregation or fighting cancer.

Humans and other animals have an exquisitely sensitive sense of smell toward the odor of low-valent organosulfur compounds such as thiols, sulfides, and disulfides. Malodorous volatile thiols are protein-degradation products found in putrid food, so sensitive identification of these compounds is crucial to avoiding intoxication. Low-valent volatile sulfur compounds are also found in areas where oxygen levels in the air are low, posing a risk of suffocation.

Copper is required for the highly sensitive detection of certain volatile thiols and related organosulfur compounds by olfactory receptors in mice. Whether humans, too, require copper for sensitive detection of thiols is not yet known.
