= Vinyldithiin =

Class of chemical compounds

Vinyldithiins, more precisely named 3-vinyl-4H-1,2-dithiin and 2-vinyl-4H-1,3-dithiin, are organosulfur phytochemicals formed in the breakdown of allicin from crushed garlic (Allium sativum). Vinyldithiins are Diels-Alder dimers of thioacrolein, H_{2}C=CHCH=S, formed in turn by decomposition of allicin. In garlic supplements, vinyldithiins are only found in garlic oil macerates that are made by incubation of crushed garlic in oil.

== Structure and occurrence ==
When a garlic clove is crushed, the enzyme alliinase is released forming allicin from the cysteine sulfoxide alliin. Allicin breaks down into additional organosulfur compounds. In the presence of oil or organic solvents, among the compounds formed are the isomeric vinyldithiins and ajoene. As shown in the Scheme, allicin (1) decomposes into 2-propenesulfenic acid (2) and thioacrolein (3). Compound 2 reforms allicin while 3 gives Diels-Alder dimers 3-vinyl-4H-1,2-dithiin (4) and 2-vinyl-4H-1,3-dithiin (5). Garlic cloves yield about 2.5-4.5 mg of allicin per gram when crushed. One fresh garlic clove weighs 2-4 g.

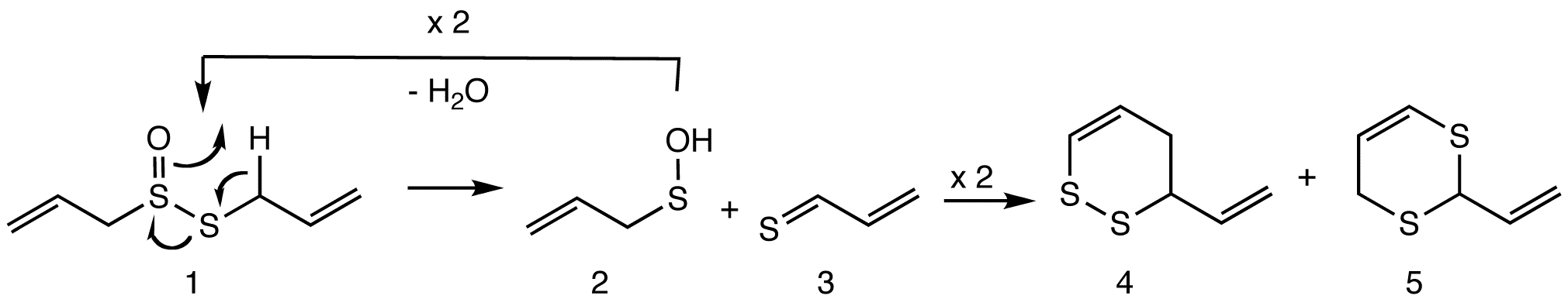
Formation_of_vinyldithiins_from_allicin

At temperatures above 400 °C, both vinyldithiins undergo retro Diels-Alder reactions and regenerate the thioacrolein 3.

== Potential health benefits ==
Vinyldithiins have been investigated as a preventative for cardiovascular disease and as antioxidants. In the early 1980s, it was noted that people in the Mediterranean had lower risk of cardiovascular disease. Since garlic is used extensively in the Mediterranean, it is hypothesized that the chemicals in garlic might have cardiovascular effects. Studies have been done measuring the use of garlic for controlling serum cholesterol levels.

Analysis of these studies show that vinyldithiins in garlic have little to no effect on serum lipids. Vinyldithiins in garlic have been shown to significantly lower the incidence of platelet aggregation. Reduction of platelet aggregation may result in reduction of myocardial infarction or ischemic stroke. It is now known that hydrogen sulfide has cardioprotective effects in cases of ischemia related to its effects as an endogenous messenger molecule, primarily via its reduction of the rate of cellular metabolism. The masked dithioacetal functionality of the geminal vinyldithiin isomer can release small but biologically relevant amounts of hydrogen sulfide through a hydrolytic process. Furthermore, divalent organosulfur compounds themselves, such as vinyldithiins are known to reduce oxidative stress via a radical process, which would be relevant to the protection of the cardiovascular system.

Ingestion of foods containing vinyldithiins and other organosulfur compounds may decrease the risk of gastric and colon cancer. 2-Vinyl-4H-1,2-dithiin was found to exhibit inhibitory activity against lipid hydroperoxide (LOOH) formation in human low-density lipoprotein (LDL). A copolymer of 2-vinyl-4H-1,2-dithiin and N-vinylpyrrolidone has been patented as a biocompatible polymer with antithrombogenic (antithrombotic) and antibiotic properties.
