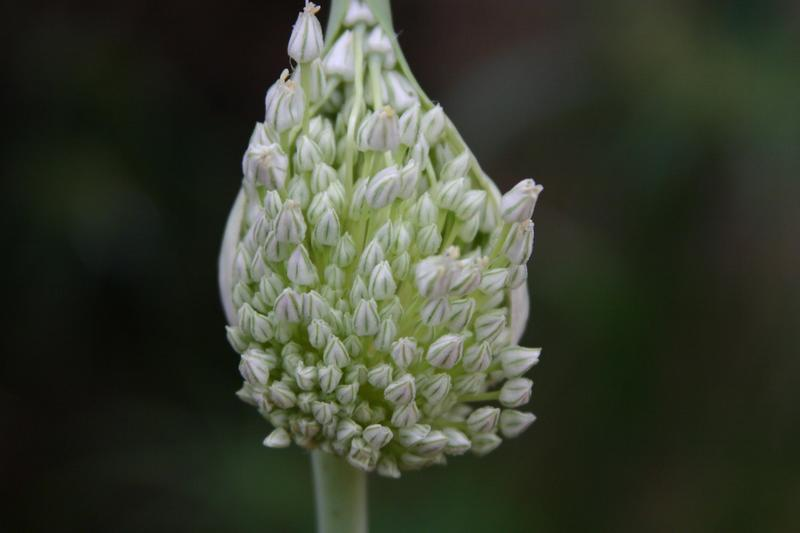

Scientific classification
- Kingdom: Plantae
- Clade: Tracheophytes
- Clade: Angiosperms
- Clade: Monocots
- Order: Asparagales
- Family: Amaryllidaceae
- Subfamily: Allioideae
- Genus: Allium
- Species: A. ampeloprasum
- Variety: A. a. var. ampeloprasum

Trinomial name
- Allium ampeloprasum var. ampeloprasum L.

= Elephant garlic =

Subspecies of flowering plant

Elephant garlic (Allium ampeloprasum var. ampeloprasum) is a plant belonging to the onion genus and a cultivar of Allium ampeloprasum, the broadleaf wild leek. It has a tall, solid, flowering stalk, and flat leaves. The flavor is milder than cultivated garlic and can be eaten raw in salads, roasted, or sautéed, but is generally not a substitute for conventional garlic in cooking.

== Classification ==
The assignment of "var. ampeloprasum" is dubious because it should refer to a group containing the type that defines A. ampeloprasum. Authors who believe that cultivated elephant garlic is a different variety from the wild one use an alternative assignment: Allium ampeloprasum var. holmense (Mill) Asch. et Graebn.

== Cultivation and use ==
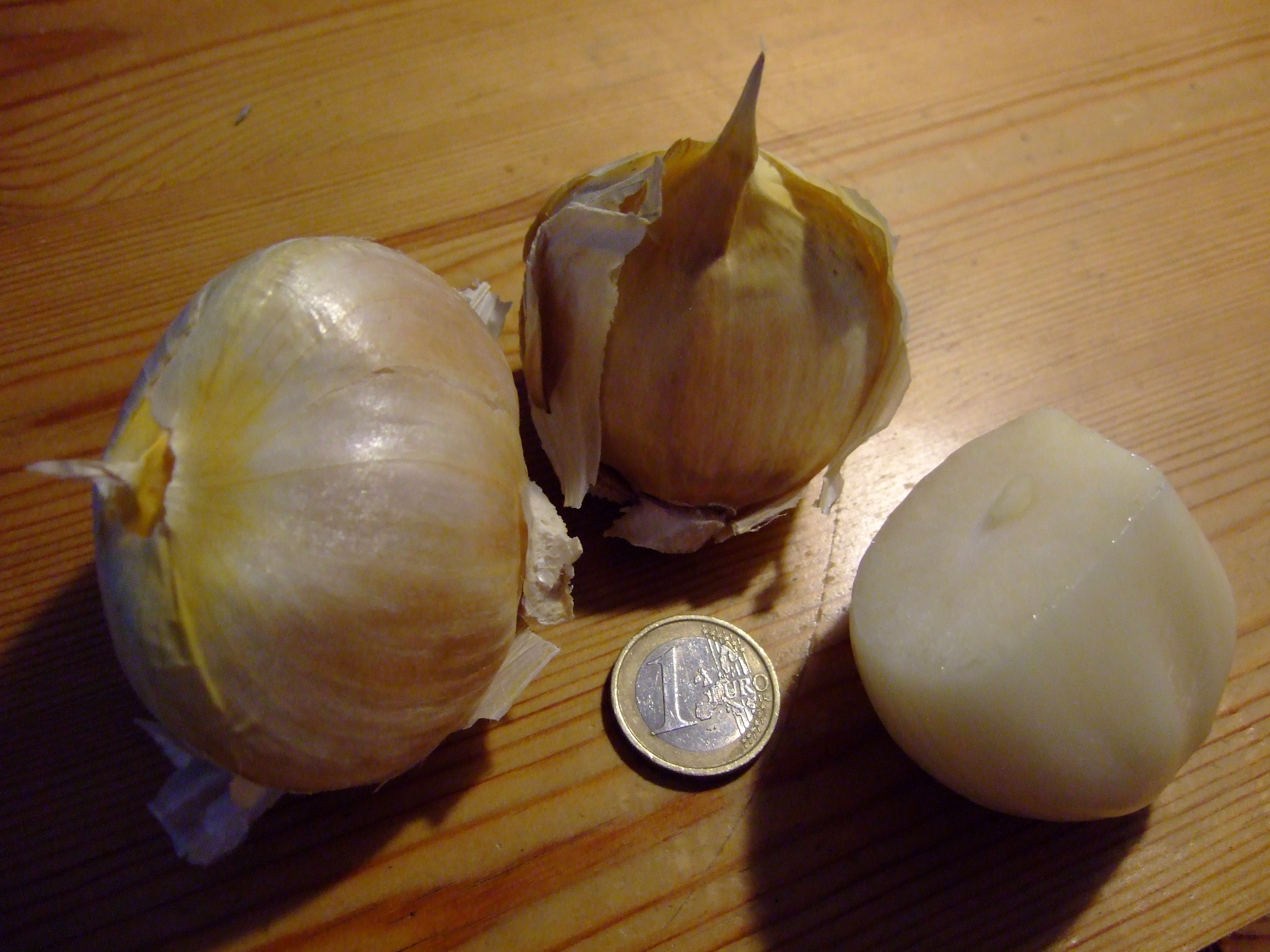
Bulb size of elephant garlic, compared with a €1 coin (the coin is approximately 0.9 inches)

The flavor is milder than garlic and can be eaten raw in salads, roasted, or sautéed, but is generally not a substitute for conventional garlic in cooking.

The mature bulb is broken up into cloves that are large with papery skins, and these are used for both culinary purposes and propagation. Also, much smaller corms with a hard shell grow on the outside of the bulb. Many gardeners often ignore these, but if they are planted, they produce a nonflowering plant in their first year, which has a solid bulb, essentially a single large clove. In their second year, this single clove then, like a normal bulb, divides into many separate cloves. While it may take an extra year, it is desirable to plant these small bulbils (several can be produced by each bulb) and increase the harvest.

Unlike many garlics, elephant garlic does not have to be harvested or divided each year, but can be ignored and left in the ground without much risk of rotting. The plant, if left alone, will spread into a clump with many flowering heads (one stalk and flower from each clove, once the bulb divides). These are often left in flower gardens as an ornament and to discourage pests. Once they get overcrowded, the plant may not do as well, and growth is stunted, with some rotting. Elephant garlic is not generally propagated by seeds.

Like regular garlic, elephant garlic can be roasted whole on the grill or baked in the oven, then used as a spread with butter on toast. Fresh elephant garlic contains mostly moisture and foams up like boiling potatoes, whether on the stove or in a glass dish in the oven. Drying in the basement for a few months reduces the moisture content and brings out a fuller flavor.

== Properties ==
When crushed and then analyzed using a DART ion source, elephant garlic has been shown to produce both allicin, found in garlic, and syn-propanethial-S-oxide (onion lachrymatory factor), found in onion and leek, but absent in garlic, consistent with the classification of elephant garlic as a closer relative of leek than of garlic. It is sometimes confused with solo garlic.

== Cultivation ==
Elephant garlic can be planted at two different times of the year: spring and autumn. In warmer areas, it can be grown over winter for a late-spring harvest.
