= Allium tuncelianum =

Tunceli garlic

Scientific classification
- Kingdom: Plantae
- Clade: Tracheophytes
- Clade: Angiosperms
- Clade: Monocots
- Order: Asparagales
- Family: Amaryllidaceae
- Subfamily: Allioideae
- Genus: Allium
- Subgenus: A. subg. Allium
- Species: A. tuncelianum

Binomial name
- Allium tuncelianum (Kollmann) Özhatay, B.Mathew & Şiraneci

Synonyms
- A. macrochaetum subsp. tuncelianum Kollmann (basionym)

Species of flowering plant

Allium tuncelianum is a species of wild onion which is endemic to the Munzur Valley in Tunceli, in eastern Turkey.It usually produces a single-bulb white onion, unlike garlic, which has multiple bulbs. It has a garlic odor and taste and is used locally like garlic. Its common names include Tunceli garlic and Ovacik garlic. Botanists have suggested this species may be a close relative of garlic, and perhaps an ancestor of garlic, but genetic analysis shows that it is actually more closely related to leek. The plant is collected from the wild for use in cooking, a phenomenon that threatens the plant with extinction. It is known that Tunceli garlic (Allium tuncelianum) shows higher antiradical activity and contains more total phenolic compounds than normal garlic (Allium sativum). In addition, it is possible to say that Tunceli garlic is a better natural antioxidant than Kastamonu garlic. Tunceli garlic is single-toothed, has small tooth-like formations between its shells, has the familiar taste and aroma of garlic, unlike others, it can flower and give seeds. It has a chance to be used in consumption as well as in industry, due to its features such as being single-toothed, the number of shells being less (1-2 pieces) compared to the cultivated garlic, and the storage of the head parts. It is stored for a long time at 18-20"C. It is collected from the mountains in the region and sold under the name of 'Rock garlic' and used as commercial goods. In an experiment conducted at Malatya Turgut Özal University, the effect of intraperitoneal injection of 1% and 10% doses of Tunceli garlic oil on some immunological factors (Bactericide, Myeloperoxidase and Lysozyme activities; Total immunoglobulin and protein) of rainbow trout was evaluated. Rohu (Labeo rohita) pups were fed a garlic supplemented diet for 60 days. This fish was then exposed to Aeromonas hydrophila (1x105 CFU) by IP injection. Rainbow trout (Oncorhynchus mykiss) fry were fed garlic to groups for 14 days prior to intraperitoneal injection challenge with Aeromonas hydrophila (1x106 CFU) per fish. In both of these studies, it was noted that fish fed garlic showed increased serum lysozyme and bactericidal activities and higher serum total protein.

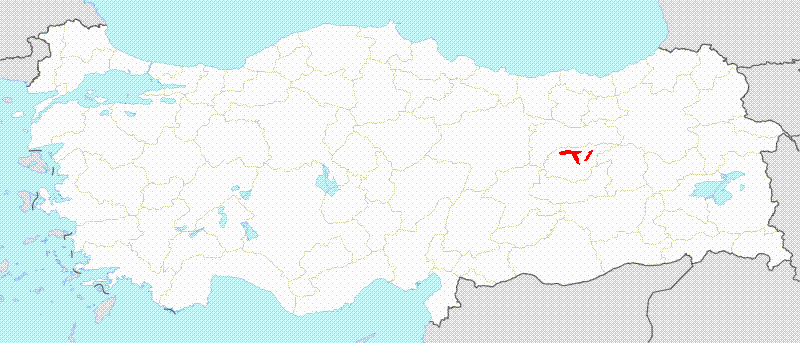
Wild range of A. tuncelianum
