= Pyruvate scale =

Measure of pungency in onions and garlic

The pyruvate scale measures pungency in onions and garlic with units of μmol/g_{fw} (micromoles per gram fresh weight). It is named after pyruvic acid, the alpha-keto acid co-product created in the biochemical pathway that forms syn-propanethial-S-oxide, the main lachrymatory agent in onions.

== Examples ==
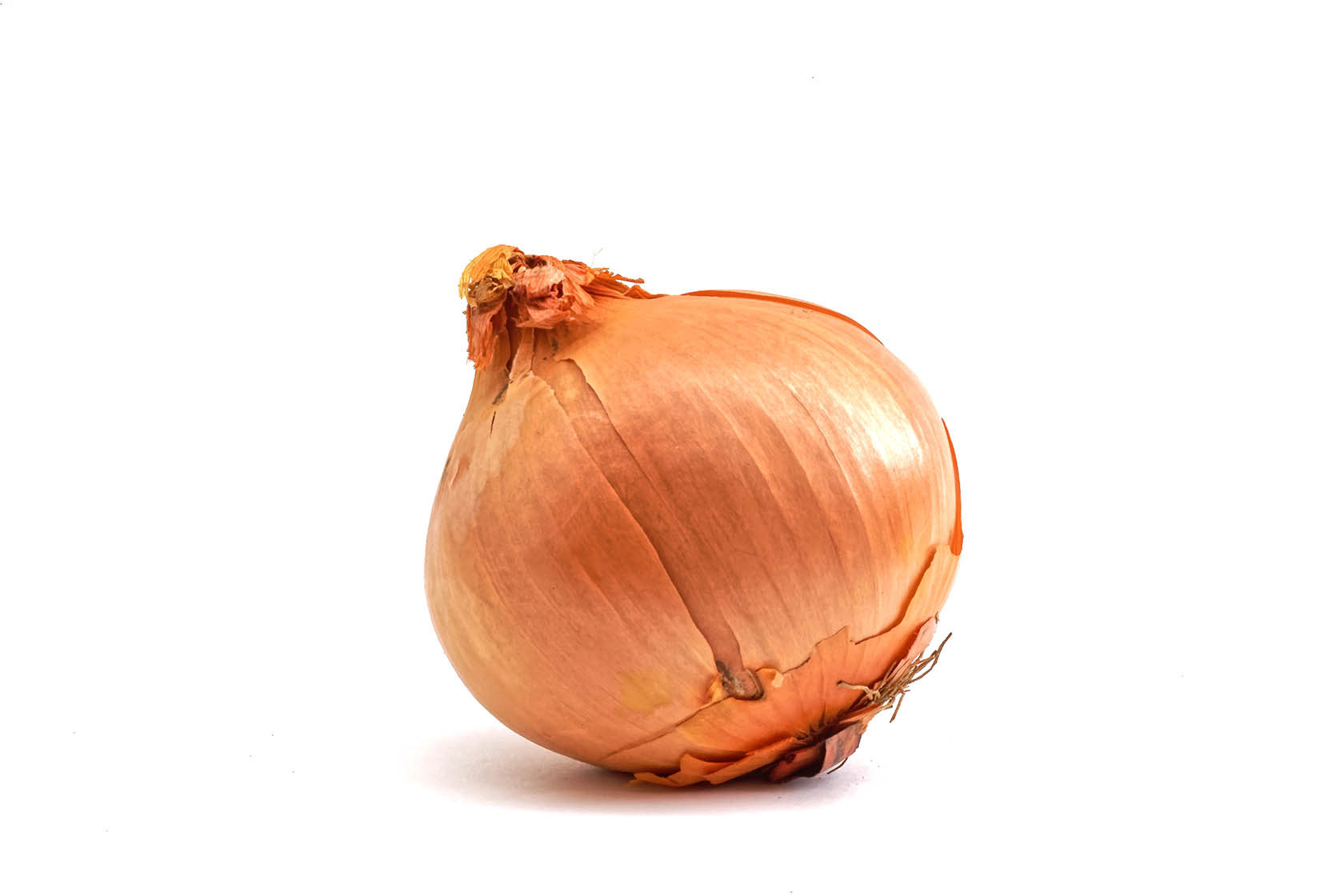
A brown onion

The standard onion has an eight rating, while "sweet onions" have a two or three rating on the scale. The lower the score or scale the more "sweet" the onions are rated. Anything less than five is considered a sweet onion. The Vidalia onion variety is considered sweet and must have a score of 5.0 μmol/g_{fw} or less. The HoneySweet brand onion is claimed to consistently rate with a pungency level of 3.5 or less.

The Supasweet onion (usually grown in Lincolnshire, England) registers 1.5 to 2 on the scale.

== Influential factors ==
Soil type, rain, and sunlight affect the pungency in onions and garlic and, therefore, their score on the pyruvate scale.

== See also ==
- Scoville scale – Scale for measuring spiciness of peppers
