= Garlic production in China =

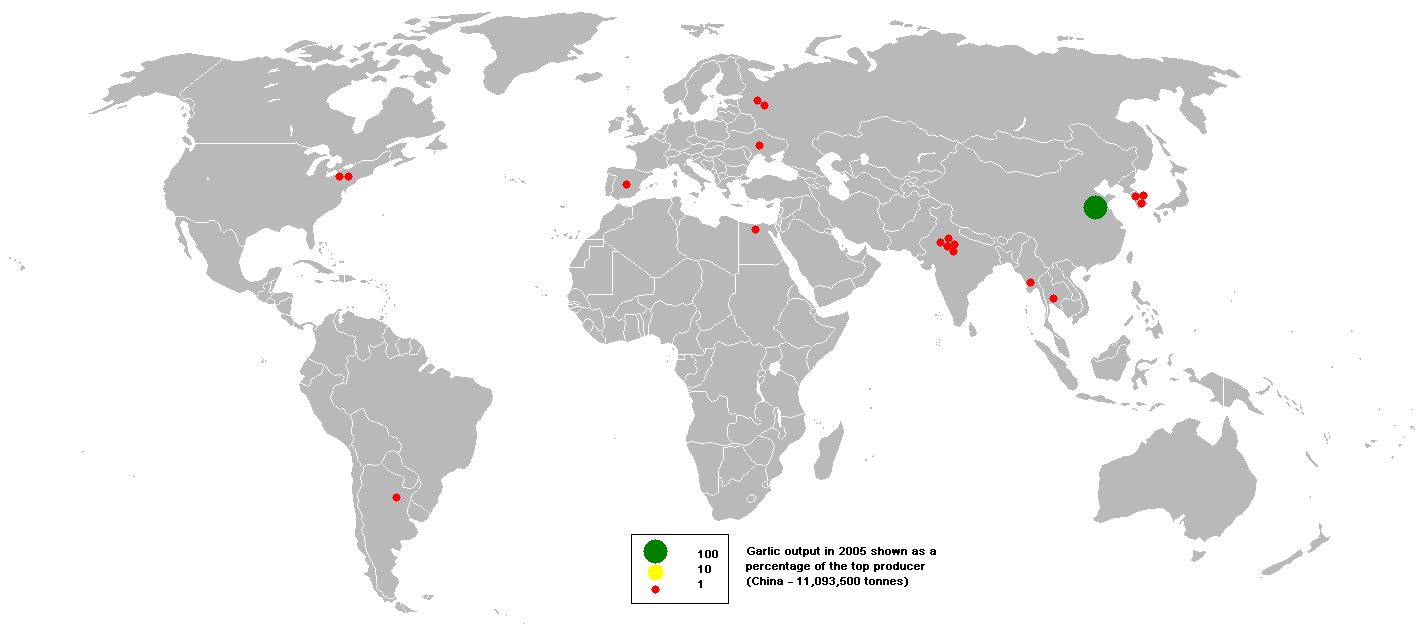
Garlic output in 2005 shown as a percentage of the top producer, China.

Garlic production in China is significant to the worldwide garlic industry, as China provides 80% of the total world production and is the leading exporter. Following China, other significant garlic producers include India (5% of world production) and Bangladesh (1%). As of 2019, China produced 23 million tonnes annually.

== History ==
Garlic in China is mentioned in the Calendar of the Xia, dating to 2000 BCE. It is theorized that its cultivation in China occurred at the same time as it did in ancient Mesopotamia. The ancient Chinese recognized the powerful antibiotic effects of garlic and used it in Chinese traditional medicine, using it to cure stomach upset and diarrhea, among other ailments.

Between 1992 and 2000, Chinese garlic exports increased from 128,239 tonnes to 383,860 tonnes annually, and it became the world's largest producer.

China has been involved in numerous disputes with competitors including South Korea, Japan and the United States, and the country has been investigated for dumping. In 1994, the US introduced a 376.67 percent anti-dumping tax on Chinese garlic for a 5-year period, and when Chinese garlic merchants failed to meet with US official to review the situation in 1999, the duty has since been kept on permanent basis. In 1994, China too introduced regulations on export of garlic to 12 countries, and under the new regulations only 16 firms were permitted to export and a fixed quota was fixed for each firm and a fee collected on that basis. The total quota allotted was mentioned by the Chinese Chamber of Commerce as 100,000 metric tons in 1994 with increasing amounts in the following four years.

In February 2001, the nations agreed to settle the long-running dispute related to China's interest in three European Union member states through a seven-year agreement. In 2004, an anti-dumping duty was imposed by Canada on garlic as the assessment at that time was China's exports met 75 percent of the world production of garlic. The review committee had also observed that the production of garlic in China amounted to a 60 percent increase over the 2000 level. In spite of this high production recorded till 2004, the FAO reported that there was a shortage of production in 2005 which resulted in increase of garlic price in the export market to US$13 per box in 2005. Mexico, Brazil, Chile, Thailand, Venezuela, and South Africa joined the US and Canada in imposing an anti-dumping duty. However, China's export of garlic to the European Union was duty provided with an exemption up to a limit of 29.1 million pounds of garlic every year, with duty imposed on rising scale on any quantity exceeding this amount.

China has also faced problems with Korea, the most important market for Chinese garlic. In 1999, Korean garlic prices fell by 30 percent, blamed on less costly imported Chinese garlic. As a result, on 1 June 2000 the Korean government introduced a 315 percent levy on imported garlic and restrictions on quantity of imports permitted. The Chinese government saw this as a direct attack on their garlic industry and retaliated a week later on 7 June 2000 by suspending the import of Korean-made mobile phones and polyethylene. Six weeks later they lifted the suspension and Korean diplomats reached an agreement over the garlic industry with the Chinese, under which South Korea could import 32,000 tonnes annually at low tariffs and would be permitted to grow by 5.25% per annum over a 3-year period. The Chinese Ministry of Foreign Trade and Economic Cooperation (MOFTEC) established the "Provisional Rules on Management of Export of Garlic to South Korea" to specifically manage and regulate it.

In January 2013 it was reported that two British men had made millions of euros smuggling Chinese garlic from Norway into the European Union; illegal as the EU imposes a 9.6 percent tariff duty on imported garlic.

Top garlic producers
- in 2019

Numbers in million tonnes
- 1. People's Republic of China (Mainland): 23.3 (75.9%)
- 2. India: 2.91 (9.48%)
- 3. Bangladesh: 0.47 (1.53%)
- 4. European Union (UK not included): 0.4 (1.3%)
- 5. South Korea: 0.38 (1.24%)
- 6. Egypt: 0.32 (1.04%)
- 7. United States: 0.24 (0.78%)
- 8. Algeria: 0.22 (0.72%)
- 9. Uzbekistan: 0.22 (0.72%)
- 10. Ukraine: 0.22 (0.72%)
- World total: 30.7

== Production ==
As of 2016, China was the largest producer of garlic in the world, producing 80% of the global supply. Most of China's garlic is produced in Shandong, an eastern coastal province, located to the south-east of Beijing; in particular, Jinxiang is known as "the world's garlic capital".

=== Methods ===
While garlic (Allium sativum L) is produced primarily for food flavoring, its uses are also noted for qualities of furthering good health. Its cultivation in China dates back to a long period, believed to have been brought from Mongolia and the type grown is known as suan. Propagation of garlic is by vegetative methods by using segments of cloves (which are covered with protective sheath) formed within bulbs as they do not produce seeds; garlic bulbs have ten leaves which are attached to the central axis of the plant. Water and nutrients are primarily stored in the clove of garlic rather than the leaves or stem. The cloves are formed distinctly when the roots and the leaves die out. Its odour is the result of allicin, which is an organic sulphur compound.

Garlic grows better in regions with temperature variation of 12 to 24 degrees Celsius. It is shallow rooted and hence good drainage condition is essential, particularly when grown in sandy soils. Use of pesticides is done after field tests. The common garlic disease is blue mold rot, particularly noted when stored in sealed containers. The plant is harvested when the leaves die out. They are pulled out with machines and if dry stored after weeding out the rotted variety, and then subject to a curing process. It can be preserved by suitable storage for up to 6 months, and the planting variety is stored in a temperature range of 5 to 10 degrees Celsius.

Some of the labor behind garlic production in China comes from prisoners. The hours are long, and according to former prisoners, "the pungent acids in the garlic can melt detainees' fingernails, exposing stinging flesh. Those who can no longer use their hands bite off the garlic skins with their teeth."

== Festivals and conferences ==
The third annual China Garlic conference was held in May 2013. It was organized by the China Chamber of Commerce of Foodstuffs, Native Produce and Animal By-products (CFNA) and its organization's sub-chamber of garlic, which comprises over 200 member companies within the garlic industry. The Second China International Garlic Festival was organized by the China Vegetable Circulation Association, the Productivity Promotion Center and the Jining Municipal People's Government in 2010 in Jinxiang. The county was recognized in 2002 by Guinness World Records as having the largest garlic cultivation area.

== Bibliography ==
- U.S. International Trade Commission (2000). Fresh Garlic from China, Inv. 731-TA-683 (Second Review). DIANE Publishing. ISBN 978-1-4578-1874-5.
