= Solo garlic =

Type of garlic with a single clove

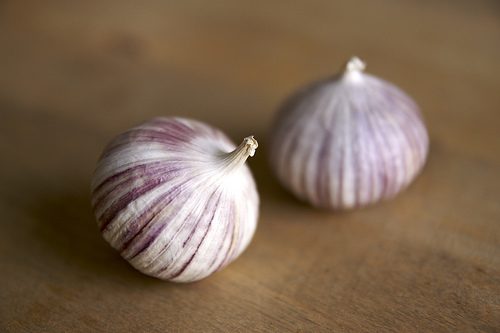
- Single clove garlic
- Species: Allium sativum
- Cultivar: Any
- Origin: Yunnan

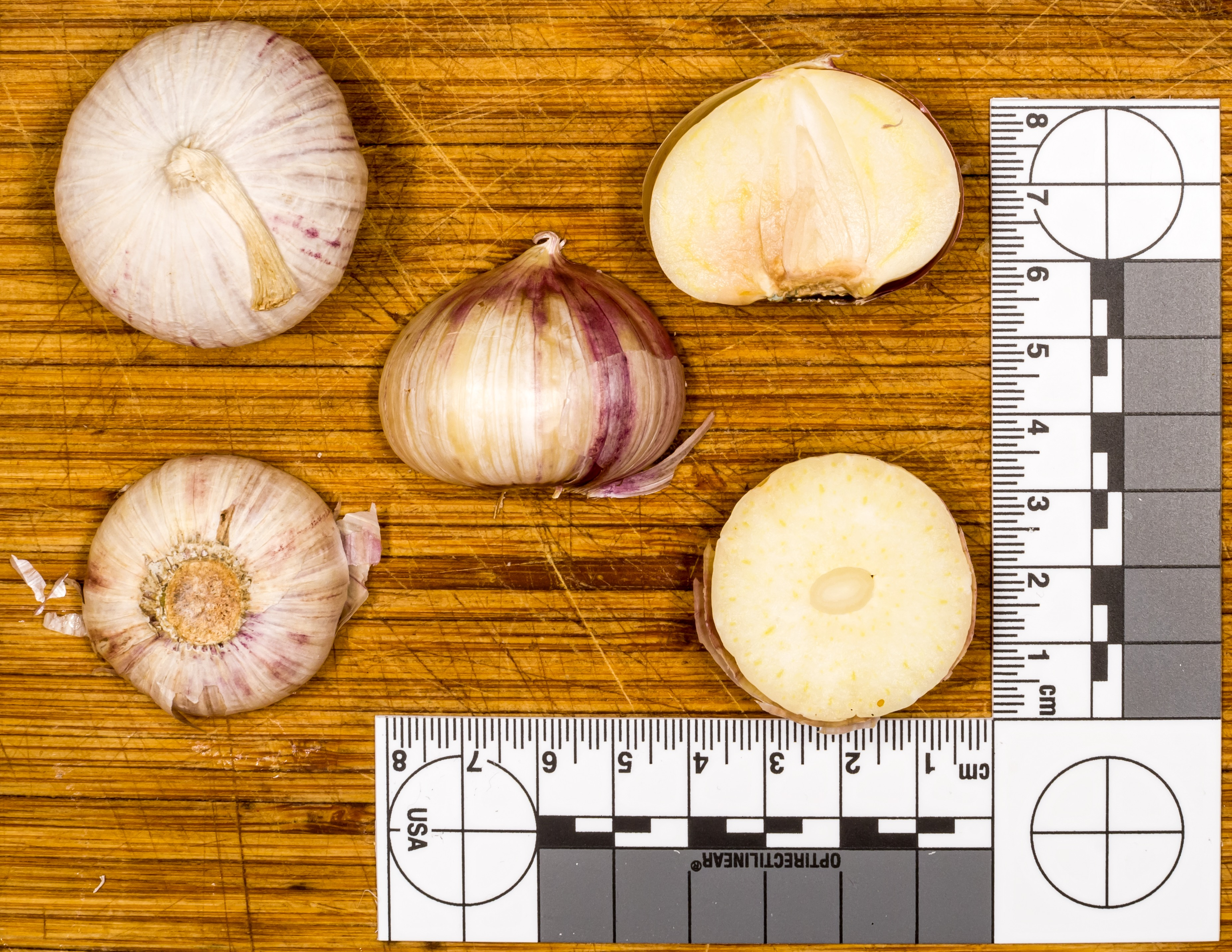
Views of the bulb

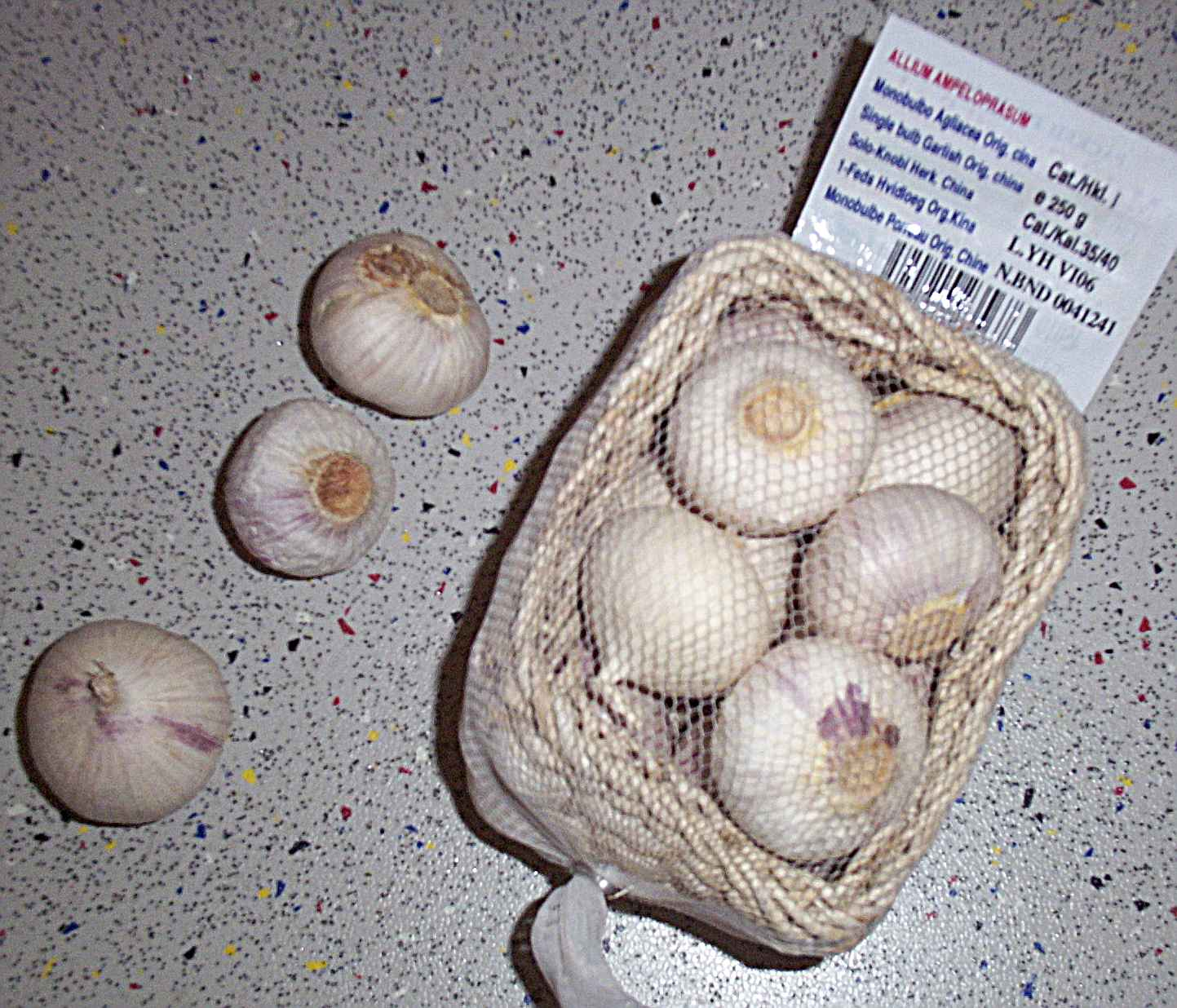
Solo garlic packaged with different language names

Solo garlic, also known as single clove garlic, chinese garlic, monobulb garlic, single bulb garlic, or pearl garlic, is a type of Allium sativum (garlic). The size of the single clove varies from approximately 25 to 50 mm (0.98 to 1.97 in) in diameter. It has the flavour of a mild and slightly perfumed garlic clove. The appearance is akin to that of a pickling onion, with white skin and often purple stripes.

Solo garlic is the result of garlic grown without the process of vernalization. Single clove garlic originated in the mountainous Yunnan province of southwestern China.

== Properties ==
The size of the single clove varies from approximately 25 to 50 mm (0.98 to 1.97 in) in diameter, with an average size between 35 and 45 mm (1.4 and 1.8 in). It has the flavour of the garlic clove but is somewhat milder and slightly perfumed. The appearance is akin to that of a pickling onion, with white skin and often purple stripes. Compared to traditional garlic, solo garlic offers the advantage of being easy to peel quickly.

== Cultivation ==
Single clove garlic originated in the mountainous Yunnan province of southwestern China. In China, the product is known as 独子蒜 ("only-child garlic").

The cloves are not a single variety of garlic, but rather a product of specific planting practices. Solo garlic is the result of garlic grown without the process of vernalization; vernalization—a form of stratification of the cloves necessary for the development of multiple-clove bulbs—requires a cold climate. As a result, single cloved versions of other garlic species such as Allium nigrum and Allium ampeloprasum are also available. Small bulbs of solo garlic can be obtained by planting the bulbils of any variety of garlic.

Commercial production comes from areas where garlic is likely to produce a solo bulb due to environmental factors.

== See also ==
- Black garlic (food)
- Pearl onion
