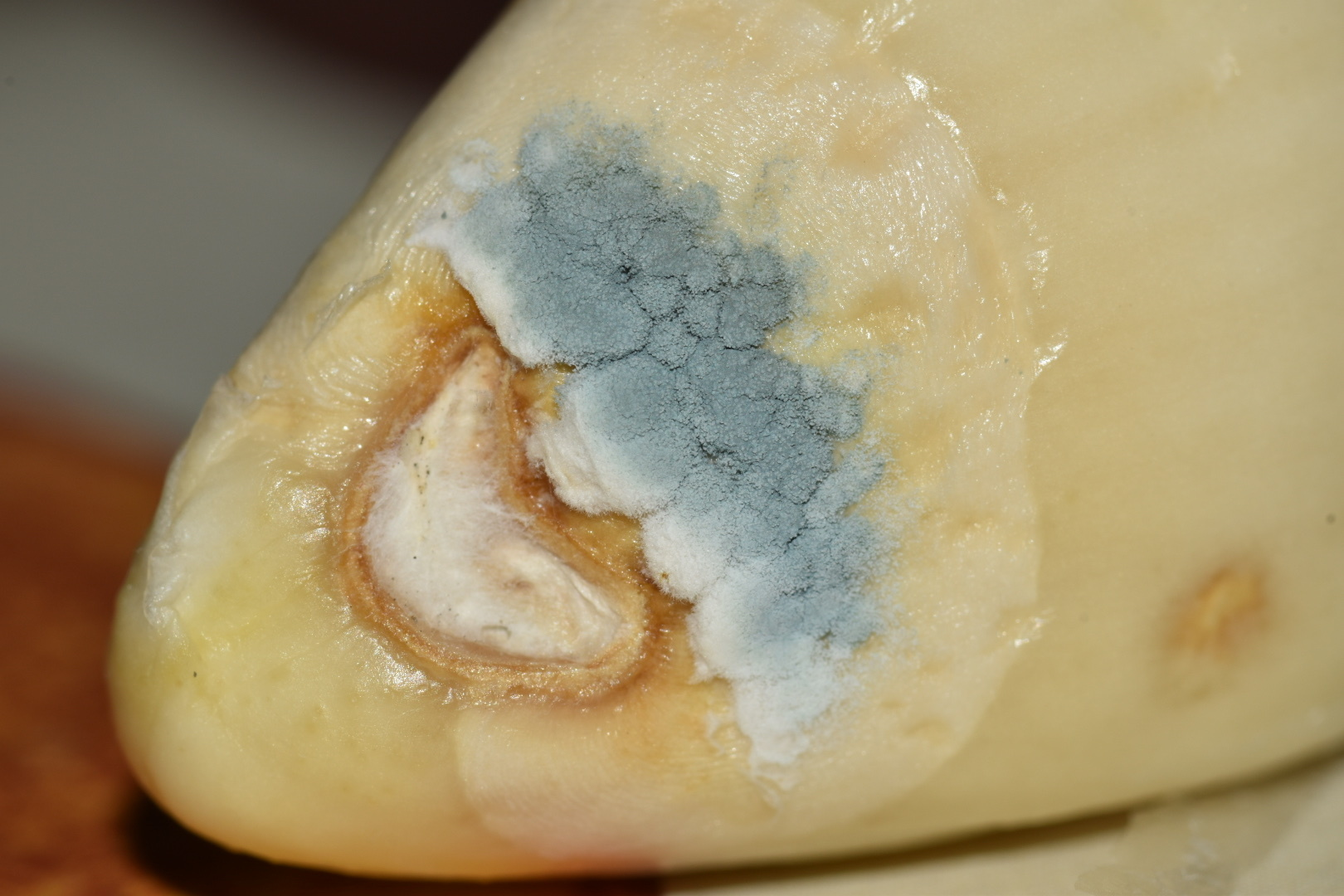

Scientific classification
- Kingdom: Fungi
- Division: Ascomycota
- Class: Eurotiomycetes
- Order: Eurotiales
- Family: Aspergillaceae
- Genus: Penicillium
- Species: P. hirsutum

Binomial name
- Penicillium hirsutum Dierckx, R.P. 1901

Synonyms
- Penicillium corymbiferum

= Penicillium hirsutum =

Species of fungus

Penicillium hirsutum is a species of fungus which causes blue mold of garlic on Allium sativum. The genus name is derived from the Latin root penicillum, meaning "painter's brush", and refers to the chains of conidia this fungus produces that resemble a broom.

Blue mold of garlic occurs during harvest and storage, and is particularly prevalent on fresh garlic. This pathogen affects a wide range of hosts in addition to garlic throughout the world including apple, citrus fruits, corn, grape, melon, and pear.

== Disease symptoms ==
Initial symptoms of blue mold of garlic caused by Penicillium hirsutum include water-soaked or pale-yellow areas on the outer surface of scales. As disease progresses, a green to blue-green, powdery mold may develop on the surface of the lesions. Infected areas of fleshy scales are tan or gray when cut. In advanced stages of disease, infected bulbs may disintegrate into a watery rot, often because of secondary infection by bacteria or yeasts.

== Disease cycle and epidemiology ==
Penicillium spp. commonly grow on plant and animal debris on soil, and in senescing plant tissues. In garlic, it is thought that the pathogen survives in infected cloves rather than the soil. Initial infection usually occurs through wounded plant tissue caused by bruising, sun-scald, freezing injury, or mechanical damage to the plant. It is possible, however, for non-wounded bulbs to be infected. Dispersal and secondary infection occurs when infectious spores are carried in the wind, or by infected cloves.

== Disease management ==
To reduce the risk of blue mold of garlic, care should be taken during cultivation to manage other diseases, and to minimize wounding of the plant, as wounds provide avenues of infection. Harvested bulbs must be handled with care to prevent bruising and wounding, and should be stored at a maximum temperature of 41 °F, with low humidity. In some countries, treating garlic with fungicides prior to storage may be recommended. Bulbs should be cured shortly after harvest.

== Economic losses ==
Significant annual crop losses in Argentina, the world's second largest exporter of garlic, have been attributed to the diseases caused by Penicillium spp.

== Mycotoxins ==
Penicillium hirsutum produces the mycotoxins cyclopiazonic acid and roquefortine C.
