= Penicillium allii =

Scientific classification
- Domain: Eukaryota
- Kingdom: Fungi
- Division: Ascomycota
- Class: Eurotiomycetes
- Order: Eurotiales
- Family: Aspergillaceae
- Genus: Penicillium
- Species: P. allii

Binomial name
- Penicillium allii Vincent, M.A.; Pitt, J.I. 1989

Synonyms
- Penicillium hirsutum var. allii

Species of fungus

Penicillium allii is an anamorph fungus species of the genus of Penicillium. Penicillium allii is a pathogen of garlic (Allium sativum).

== See also ==
- List of Penicillium species
