= Allium macrochaetum =

Scientific classification
- Kingdom: Plantae
- Clade: Tracheophytes
- Clade: Angiosperms
- Clade: Monocots
- Order: Asparagales
- Family: Amaryllidaceae
- Subfamily: Allioideae
- Genus: Allium
- Species: A. macrochaetum

Binomial name
- Allium macrochaetum Boiss. & Hausskn.

Synonyms
- Allium laeve Wendelbo & Bothmer

Species of plant

Allium macrochaetum, the Kaya garlic, is a widespread species of flowering plant in the family Amaryllidaceae. It is native to central Anatolia, Lebanon, Syria, Jordan, Iraq, and northwestern Iran. It is edible and is used medicinally by local peoples.
