= Ajoene =

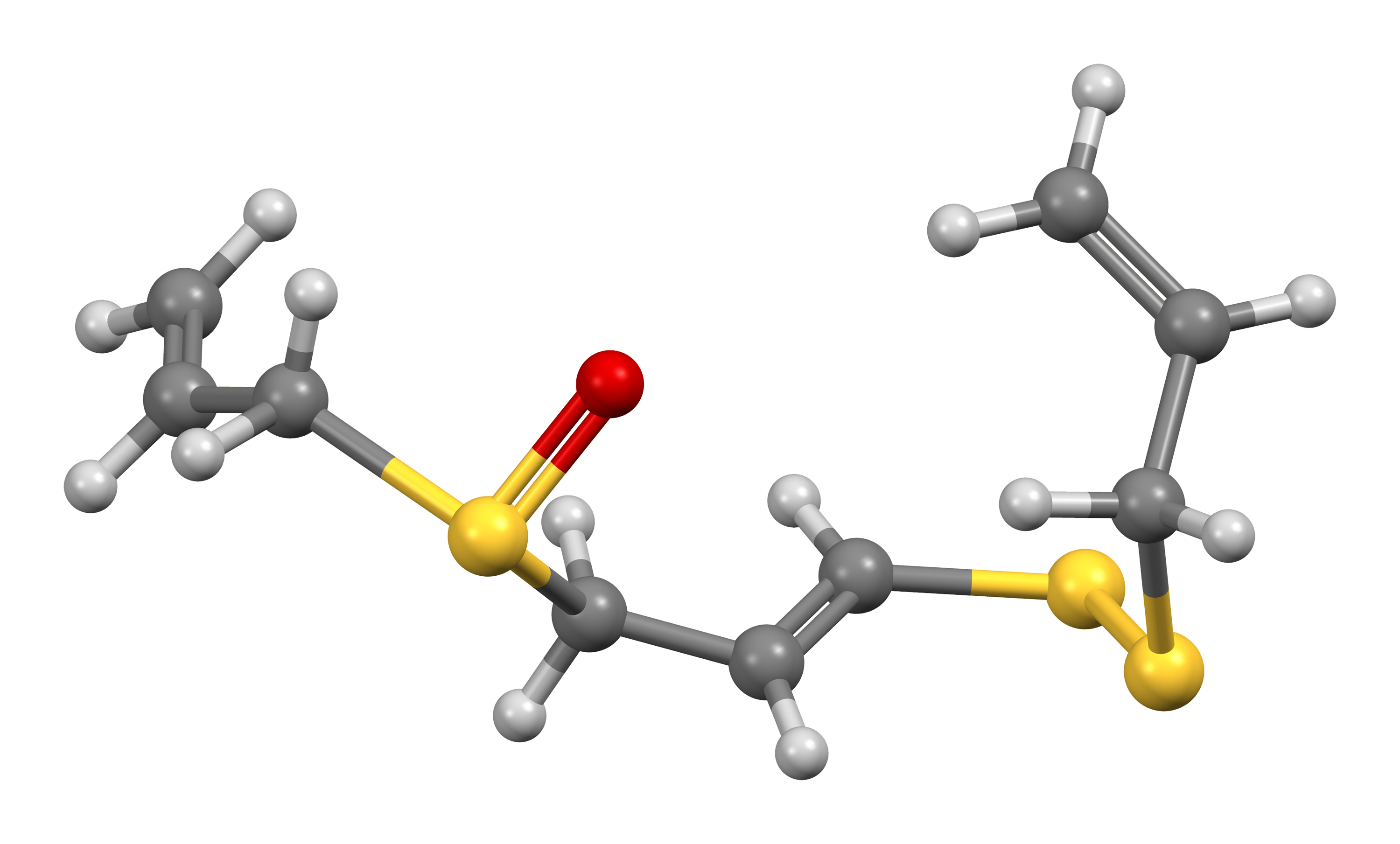

Names
- Preferred IUPAC name 3-(Prop-2-ene-1-sulfinyl)-1-[(prop-2-en-1-yl)disulfanyl]prop-1-ene

Identifiers
| CAS Number | 92285-01-3 |
| 3D model (JSmol) | Interactive image |
| ChEMBL | ChEMBL122890 |
| ChemSpider | 4533332 |
| PubChem CID | 5386591 |
| UNII | 99A0041VG8 |
| CompTox Dashboard (EPA) | DTXSID501318485 |
- InChI: InChI=1S/C9H14OS3/c1-3-6-11-12-7-5-9-13(10)8-4-2/h3-5,7H,1-2,6,8-9H2/b7-5+ Key: IXELFRRANAOWSF-FNORWQNLSA-N; InChI=1/C9H14OS3/c1-3-6-11-12-7-5-9-13(10)8-4-2/h3-5,7H,1-2,6,8-9H2/b7-5+ Key: IXELFRRANAOWSF-FNORWQNLBE
- SMILES: O=S(C/C=C/SSC/C=C)C\C=C

Properties
| Chemical formula | C_{9}H_{14}OS_{3} |
| Molar mass | 234.39 g·mol^{−1} |
- Except where otherwise noted, data are given for materials in their standard state (at 25 °C [77 °F], 100 kPa). verify (what is ?) Infobox references

Ajoene /ˈɑːhoʊ.iːn/ is an organosulfur compound found in garlic (Allium sativum) extracts. It is a colorless liquid that contains sulfoxide and disulfide functional groups. The name (and pronunciation) is derived from "ajo", the Spanish word for garlic. It is found as a mixture of up to four stereoisomers, which differ in terms of the stereochemistry of the central alkene (E- vs Z-) and the chirality of the sulfoxide sulfur (R- vs S-).

== History and syntheses ==
The structure of ajoene was determined and it was synthesized based on biosynthetic considerations in 1984, correcting an incorrect structure published in 1983. A short, scalable total synthesis of ajoene was reported in 2018 by Wirth and coworkers. Syntheses of various ajoene analogues have also been reported. The chemistry of ajoene has been extensively investigated.

When a garlic clove is crushed or finely chopped, allicin is released, with subsequent formation of ajoene when the material is dissolved in various solvents including edible oils. Ajoene is also found in garlic extract. Ajoene is most stable and most abundant in macerate of garlic (chopped garlic in edible oil).

The reaction sequence that forms ajoene (2 in the diagram) involves two molecules of allicin. First, one allicin molecule (1 in the diagram) fragments to form 2-propenesulfenic acid and thioacrolein. These two react in separate stages with another allicin molecule by way of a conjugated thiocationic intermediate.

== Medicinal properties ==
Ajoene has multiple medicinal uses. It functions as an antioxidant by inhibiting the release of superoxide. Ajoene also has antithrombotic (anti-clotting) properties, which helps prevent platelets in the blood from forming blood clots, potentially reducing the risk of heart disease and stroke in humans. Ajoene has shown potential virucidal properties against a number of viruses including vesicular stomatitis, vaccinia, human rhinovirus parainfluenza, and herpes simplex. In the infected cell system of a human immunodeficiency virus (HIV), it is shown to block the integrin-dependent processes.

Ajoene has broad-spectrum antimicrobial (antibacterial and antifungal) properties. For example, Ajoene has been shown to have activity against the human dermatophyte Trichophyton rubrum, the most common cause of tinea pedis, commonly known as Athlete's Foot. The specific mechanism of action is unclear, but is thought to be related to the inhibition of phosphatidylcholine biosynthesis in human dermatophytes. In a randomized study by Ledezma et al. (2000), 70 soldiers from the Venezuelan Armed Forces with KOH or culture proven tinea pedis interdigitalis were randomly distributed into 3 treatment groups: 0.6% ajoene, 1% ajoene, and 1% terbinafine (commercially available as Lamisil AT) applied twice daily for 1 week. At the 60 day follow up, 72%, 100%, and 94% of the patients treated with 0.6% and 1% ajoene, and 1% terbinafine, respectively, had maintained culture-proven mycologic cure suggesting that short-term topical treatment with ajoene is at least as effective as topical terbinafine for treating tinea pedis.

Ajoene has been investigated as a chemotherapeutic agent for treatment of cancer stem cells in glioblastoma multiforme, of lung adenocarcinoma and as an anti-leukemia agent for acute myeloid leukemia therapy. Ajoene has been found to decrease basal-cell carcinoma tumor size by inducing apoptosis while it has also been shown effective in inhibiting tumor cell growth by targeting the microtubule cytoskeleton of such cells and by other mechanisms. Ajoene inhibits genes controlled by quorum sensing, through binding to the RNA chaperone Hfq, then hindering its interaction with the small RNAs that, ultimately, control the production of quorum sensing autoinducers. Since this interaction occurs at the proximal Hfq binding site (the first site that small RNAs bind to), the subsequent pairing with messenger RNAs never occurs and the expression of virulence factors in Gram-negatives is impaired.
