= Black garlic =

Aged garlic

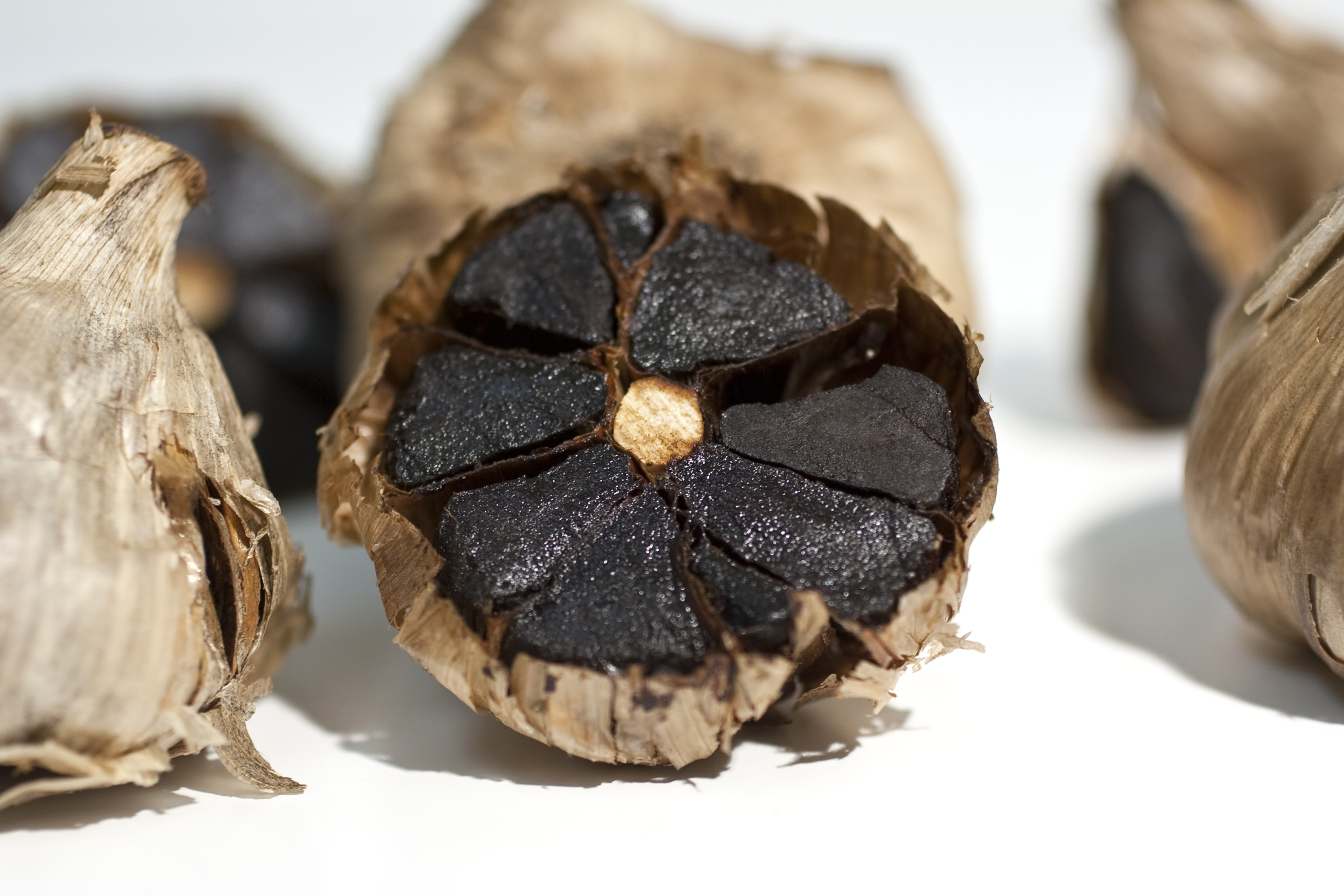
Black garlic

Black garlic is a type of aged garlic that is colored deep brownish-black. The process is of East Asian origin. It is made by placing garlic (Allium sativum) in a warm, moist, controlled environment over the course of several weeks – a Maillard reaction process that produces black cloves having a savory flavor different from unfermented garlic. Black garlic is used in diverse culinary applications, such as sauces, salads, meats, chocolate, ice cream, and beer.

== Production and characteristics ==
Black garlic is produced when heads of garlic or separated cloves are aged in an environment of controlled humidity (80 to 90%) at temperatures ranging from 60 to 90 °C (140 to 190 °F) for 15 to 90 days (typically 85% humidity at 70 °C for 40 days). No additives or preservatives are used and there is no burning of the garlic, with the dark color arising from a long-term, low temperature Maillard reaction. The cloves turn black and develop a sticky date-like texture. The sulfurous enzymes and amino acids in garlic cloves are converted to sugars during this Maillard process, reducing the typical garlic pungency in garlic aroma and flavor while creating new properties characteristic of black garlic.

Bacterial endophytes capable of fermentation and with strong heat resistance have been identified in common garlic and black garlic. These may have relevance in black garlic production.

Black garlic is different from black garlic oil (māyu) which is unfermented garlic cooked in oil on a stove.

Black garlic has a rich content of polyphenols, particularly hydroxycinnamic acid derivatives, which may contribute to its aroma and flavor.

== Flavor profile ==
In black garlic, the distinct pungency of fresh garlic is softened, such that it almost or entirely disappears, and the garlic develops notes of licorice, tamarind and molasses. Its flavor is dependent on that of the fresh garlic that was used to make it. Garlic with a higher sugar content produces a milder, more caramel-like flavor, whereas garlic with a low sugar content produces a sharper, somewhat more acidic flavor. Burnt flavors may also be present if the garlic was heated for too long at too high a temperature or not long enough: during heating, the garlic turns black in color well before the full extent of its sweetness is able to develop.

== Culinary uses ==
The increased popularity of black garlic occurred in the early 21st century. Applications include savory sauces for fish, risotto or chicken. In the United Kingdom it made its TV debut on the BBC's Something for the Weekend cooking and lifestyle program in February 2009, where a garlic farmer claimed to have cured black garlic by exposing bulbs to heat and moisture for more than a month, borrowing the concept from a 4,000-year-old Korean recipe.

Black garlic can be paired with sweet foods such as chocolate, or savory foods such as meat, fish, or cheese. Black garlic may also be included as an ingredient in sauces, dressings, and vegetable dishes. The cloves may also be mashed and spread on bread or crackers.

Black garlic can be made with a rice cooker, with the intent to maintain the high temperature and humidity over several days.
