= Gripe water =

Non-prescription product sold to relieve discomforts of infants

Gripe water is a non-prescription product sold in many countries around the world to relieve colic and other gastrointestinal ailments and discomforts of infants. No evidence supports the efficacy of gripe water and one limited study in India questions whether the consumption of gripe water is related to vomiting in babies that already showed signs of colic. The original formula contained alcohol and sugar in addition to sodium bicarbonate and dill oil. Present-day products do not contain alcohol, and may contain fennel, ginger, chamomile or lemon balm in addition to, or as a replacement for, dill oil. Some gripe water products still contain sugar, while others may contain charcoal. Amounts given are one to several teaspoons (5 mL = one teaspoon) per day.

== History ==
Gripe water was invented in 1851 by William Woodward, an English pharmacist who did his apprenticeship in Lincolnshire and later bought a business in Nottingham. Gripe water was adopted as a prescription by physicians. In the 1840s, babies in Eastern England had a condition known as "fen fever", and during that time there was also an outbreak of malaria in England. Woodward took his inspiration from the treatments for malaria and "fen fever". He noted that the formula used to treat fen fever was an effective "soother of fretful babies and provided relief from gastrointestinal troubles in infants." The original Woodward's Gripe Water contained 3.6% alcohol, dill oil, sodium bicarbonate, sugar, and water. Woodward registered "Gripe Water" as a trademark in 1876. It was initially marketed with the slogan "Granny told Mother and Mother told me." Modern formulations of Woodward's Gripe Water do not contain alcohol or sugar.

Prior to alcohol's removal from the recipe, Woodward's maximum recommended dose of gripe water contained an alcohol content equivalent to much less than one tot of whiskey for an 80 kg adult. It was only in 1992 that Britain mandated that alcohol be removed from gripe water, and in 1993 the United States Food and Drug Administration (FDA) ordered an automatic detention of all shipments of Woodward's Gripe Water into the U.S. on the basis of its being an unapproved drug. In response to the FDA's import alert, gripe water products are sold as dietary supplements.

== Use ==
The formulation now varies according to brand and the country of manufacture. In most countries alcohol is no longer in the product. Sugar may or may not be in the product. Sodium bicarbonate, dill seed oil, fennel oil and sometimes ginger extract are the ingredients claimed to be effective. Evidence of gripe water's effectiveness has been limited to anecdotal accounts. Its commercial success has led to imitation brands of varying formulas.

Gripe water is available in the United States as an over-the-counter dietary supplement. A 2000 review in the Journal of the Royal Society of Medicine found that most of the ingredients in Woodward's gripe water are of little value in relieving infantile discomfort and that any benefit may be no more complicated than the baby receiving some sweet-tasting liquid. A 2012 review also came out against the use of these products.

In a 2015 study of 350 infants conducted in Puducherry, India, two-thirds of mothers of infants ages 1 to 6 months admitted to administering gripe water to their children at least once a day. The mothers believed that gripe water helps in digestion and prevents stomach ache. However, infant colic, vomiting and constipation were significantly more common in gripe water administered infants compared to those who were exclusively breast fed. The study did not indicate the rate of constipation or vomiting prior to the use of gripe water to compare with during use. Constipation was reported for 19.5% of the infants who were given gripe water compared to 5.8% for those who were not.

== Health warnings ==
More recent studies of gripe water have revealed the contents of the solution today. The original brand of gripe water created by Woodward and one of the most popular brands of gripe water today, was originally a mixture of alcohol and sugar.

The CDC has issued warnings to parents regarding various products containing lead, including gripe water. Health departments from the local to international level warn against its use for infants due to lack of research and highly varied ingredients.
