= List of essential oils =

Essential oils are volatile and liquid aroma compounds from natural sources, usually plants. They are not oils in a strict sense, but often share with oils a poor solubility in water. Essential oils often have an odor and are therefore used in food flavoring and perfumery. They are usually prepared by fragrance extraction techniques (such as distillation, cold pressing, or Solvent extraction). Essential oils are distinguished from aroma oils (essential oils and aroma compounds in an oily solvent), infusions in a vegetable oil, absolutes, and concretes. Typically, essential oils are highly complex mixtures of often hundreds of individual aroma compounds.

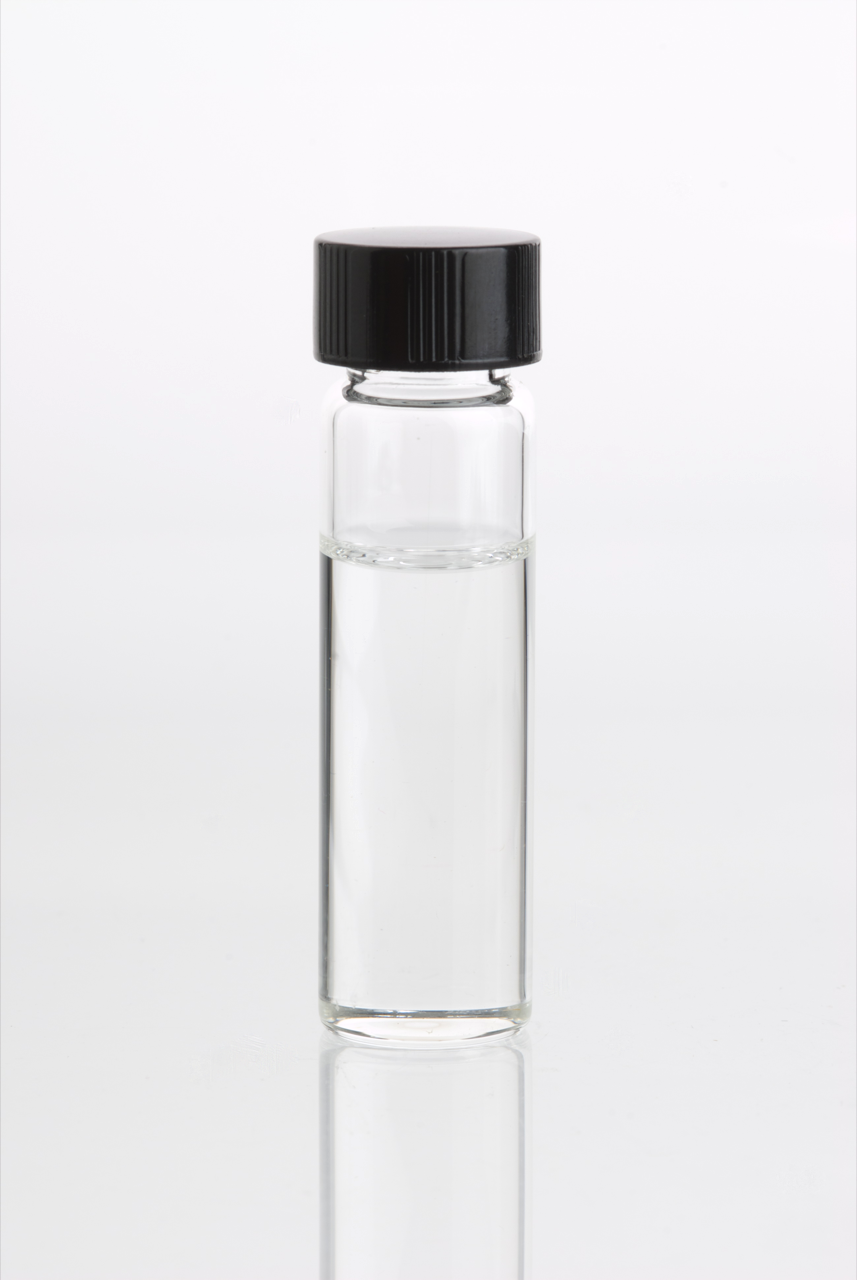
Essential oil of Eucalyptus

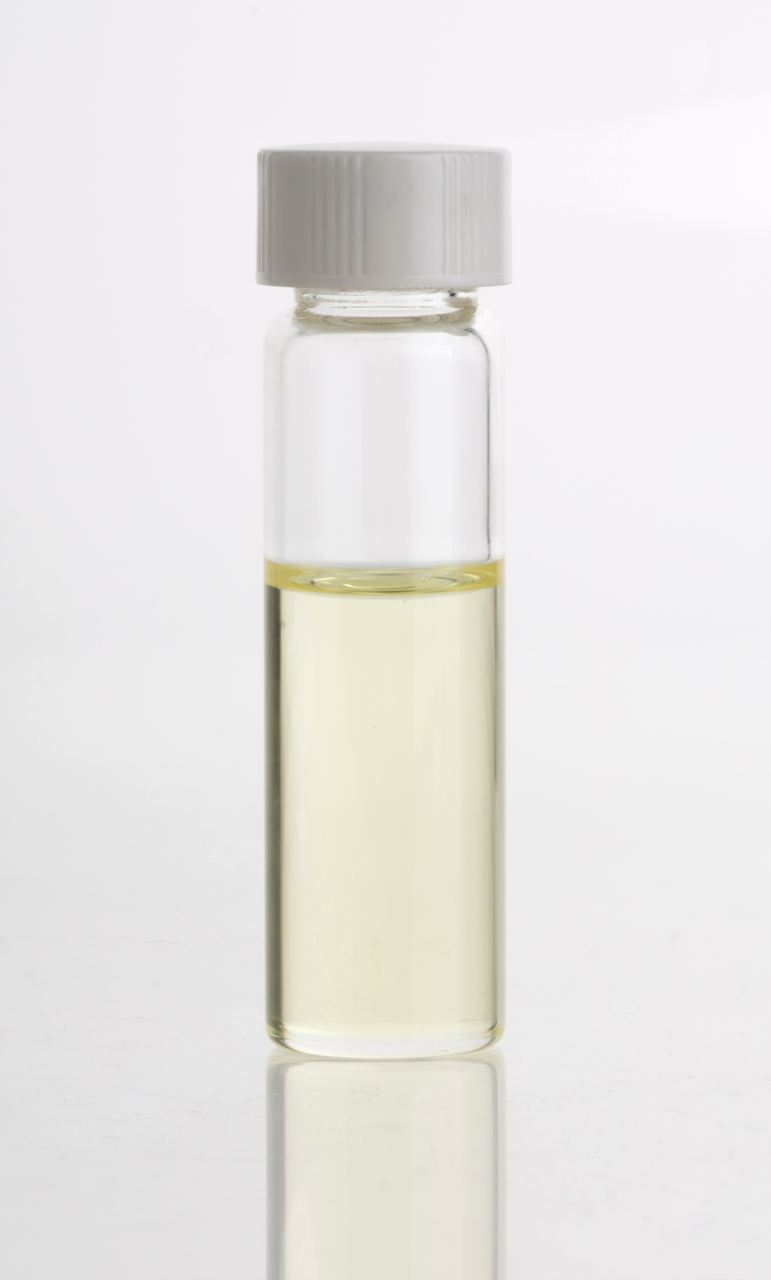
A glass vial containing sandalwood oil

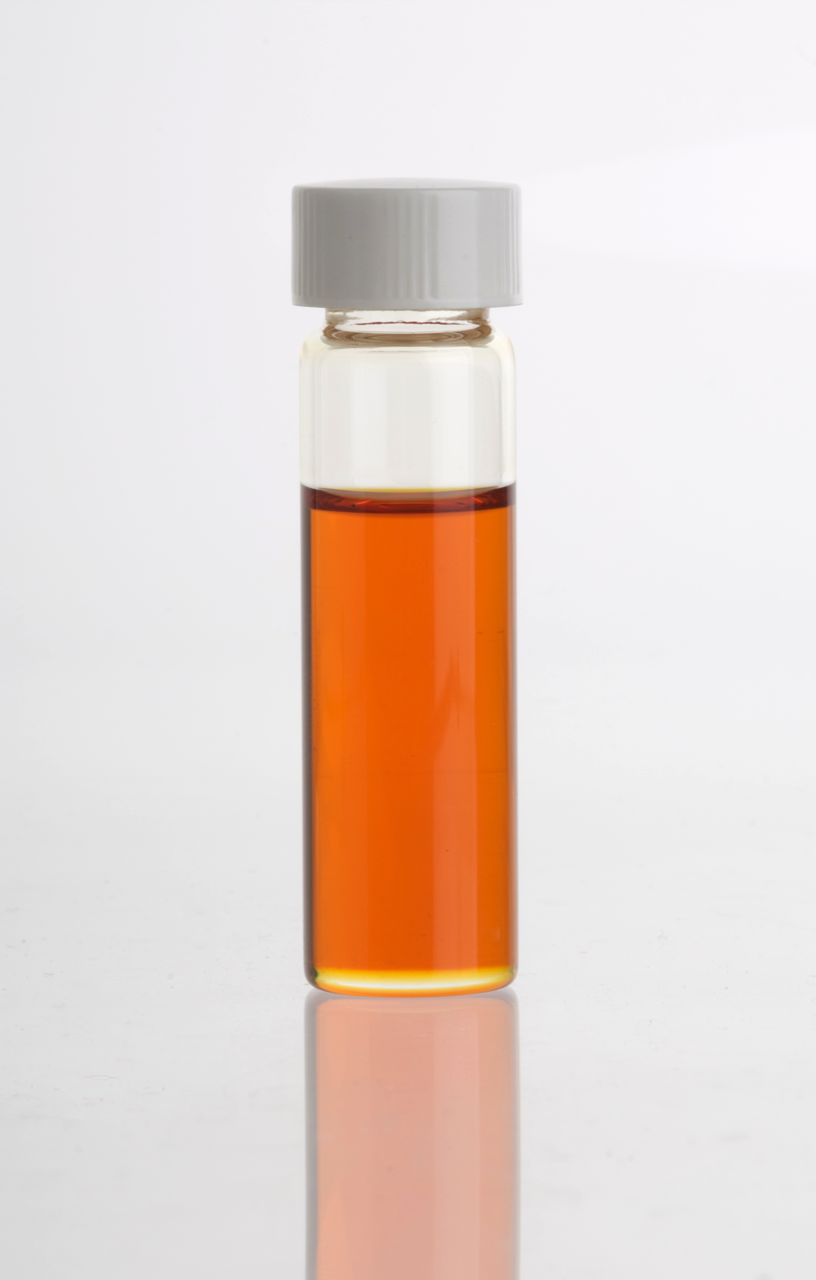
Davana essential oil

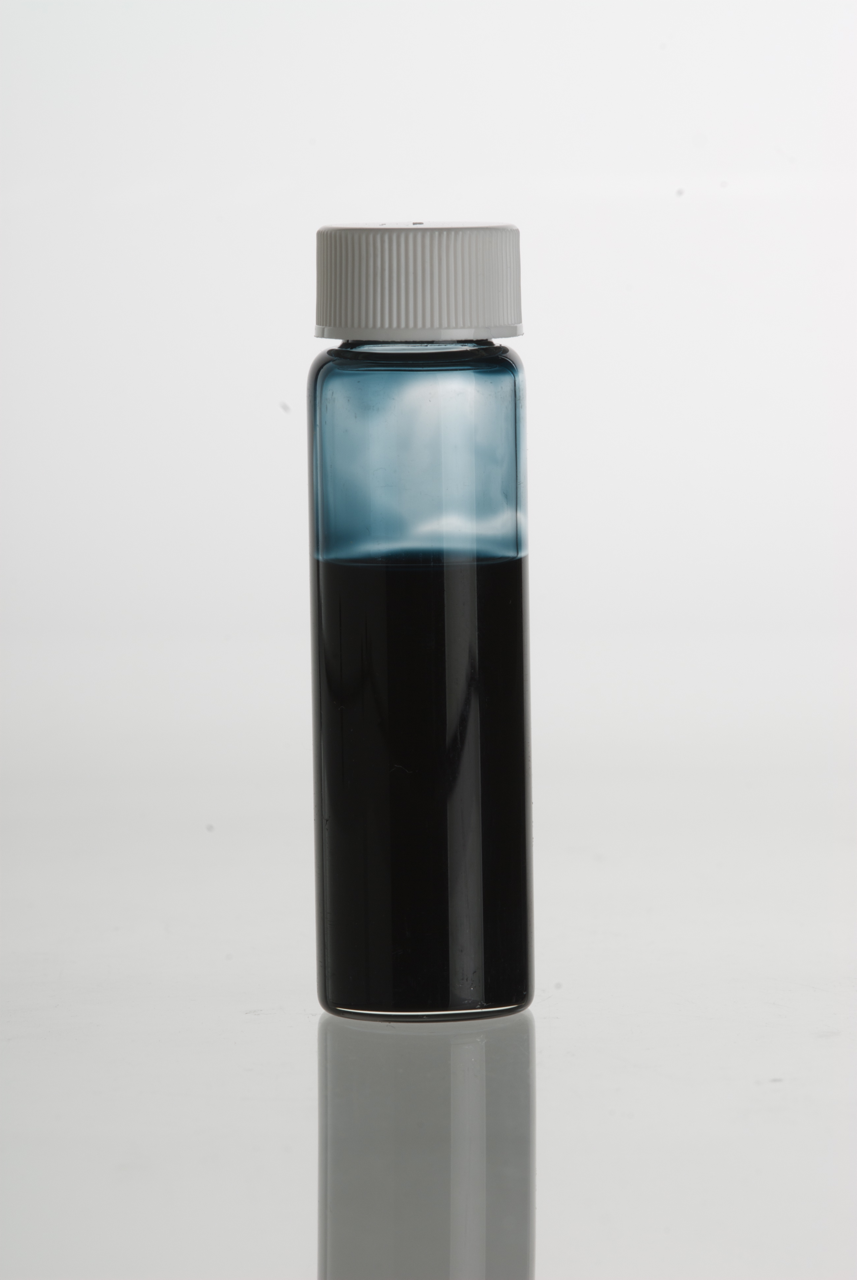
Vial of Tanacetum annuum oil (blue tansy)

- Agar oil or oodh, distilled from agarwood (Aquilaria malaccensis). Highly prized for its fragrance.
- Ajwain oil, distilled from the leaves of (Carum copticum). Oil contains 35–65% thymol.
- Amyris oil
- Angelica root oil, distilled from the Angelica archangelica. Has a green musky scent.
- Anise oil, from the Pimpinella anisum, rich odor of licorice
- Armoise/Mugwort oil A green and camphorous essential oil.
- Asafoetida oil, used to flavor food.
- Attar or ittar, used in perfumes for fragrances such as rose and sandlewood.
- Balsam of Peru, from the Myroxylon, used in food and drink for flavoring, in perfumes and toiletries for a cheaper alternative to vanilla.
- Basil oil, used in making perfumes, as well as in aromatherapy
- Bay leaf oil is used in perfumery and aromatherapy
- Beeswax absolute A solid absolute with a rich, honeyed scent. Mainly used in perfumery.
- Bergamot oil, used in aromatherapy and in perfumes.
- Birch oil used in aromatherapy
- Bitter Almond oil, Mainly used to extract benzaldehyde for the use of perfumery. Has a rich maraschino cherry scent
- Black pepper oil is distilled from the berries of Piper nigrum.
- Buchu oil, made from the buchu shrub. Considered toxic and no longer widely used. Formerly used medicinally.
- Calamodin oil or calamansi essential oil comes from a citrus tree in the Philippines extracted via cold press or steam distillation.
- Calamus oil Used in perfumery and formerly as a food additive
- Camphor oil used in cosmetics and household cleaners.
- Cannabis flower essential oil, used as a flavoring in foods, primarily candy and beverages. Also used as a scent in perfumes, cosmetics, soaps, and candles.
- Caraway seed oil, used a flavoring in foods. Also used in mouthwashes, toothpastes, etc. as a flavoring agent.
- Cardamom seed oil, used in aromatherapy. Extracted from seeds of subspecies of Zingiberaceae (ginger). Also used as a fragrance in soaps, perfumes, etc.
- Carrot seed oil, used in aromatherapy.
- Cedar oil (or cedarwood oil), primarily used in perfumes and fragrances.
- Chamomile oil, there are many varieties of chamomile but only two are used in aromatherapy, Roman and German. German chamomile contains a higher level of the chemical azulene
- Cinnamon oil, used for flavoring
- Cistus ladanifer leaves and flowers used in perfumery.
- Citron oil, used in Ayurveda and perfumery.
- Citronella oil, from a plant related to lemon grass is used as an insect repellent
- Clary Sage oil, used in perfumery and as an additive flavoring in some alcoholic beverages.
- Clove oil used in perfumery and medicinally.
- Coconut oil, used for skin, food, and hair
- Coffee oil, used to flavor food.
- Coriander oil
- Costmary oil (bible leaf oil), formerly used medicinally in Europe; still used as such in southwest Asia. Discovered to contain up to 12.5% of the toxin β-thujone.
- Costus root oil
- Cranberry seed oil, equally high in omega-3 and omega-6 fatty acids, primarily used in the cosmetic industry.
- Cubeb oil, used to flavor foods.
- Cumin seed oil/black seed oil, used as a flavor, particularly in meat products
- Curry leaf oil, used to flavor food.
- Cypress oil, used in cosmetics
- Cypriol oil, from Cyperus scariosus
- Davana oil, from the Artemisia pallens, used as a perfume ingredient
- Dill oil, chemically almost identical to Caraway seed oil. High carvone content.
- Douglas-fir oil is unique amongst conifer oils as Douglas-fir is not a true Fir but its own genus. The New Zealand variety steam distilled using mountain spring water is particularly sought after for its purity and chemical profile.
- Elecampane oil
- Elemi oil, used as a perfume and fragrance ingredient. Comes from the oleoresins of Canarium luzonicum and Canarium ovatum which are common in the Philippines.
- Eucalyptus oil, historically used as a germicide.
- Fennel seed oil
- Fenugreek oil, used for cosmetics from ancient times.
- Fir oil
- Frankincense oil, used in aromatherapy and in perfumes.
- Galangal oil, used to flavor food.
- Galbanum oil, used in perfumery.
- Garlic oil is distilled from Allium sativum.
- Geranium oil, also referred to as geraniol. Used in herbal medicine, aromatherapy, and perfumery.
- Ginger oil, used medicinally in many cultures, and has been studied extensively as a nausea treatment, where it was found more effective than placebo.
- Goldenrod oil used in herbal medicine, including treatment of urological problems.
- Grapefruit oil, extracted from the peel of the fruit. Used in aromatherapy. Contains 90% limonene.
- Henna oil, used in body art. Known to be dangerous to people with certain enzyme deficiencies. Pre-mixed pastes are considered dangerous, primarily due to adulterants.
- Helichrysum oil
- Hickory nut oil
- Horseradish oil
- Hyssop
- Jasmine oil, used for its flowery fragrance.
- Juniper berry oil, used as a flavor.
- Lavender oil, used primarily as a fragrance.
- Ledum
- Lemon oil, similar in fragrance to the fruit. Unlike other essential oils, lemon oil is usually cold pressed. Used in cosmetics.
- Lemongrass. Lemongrass is a highly fragrant grass from India. The oil is very useful for insect repellent.
- Lime
- Litsea cubeba oil, lemon-like scent, often used in perfumes and aromatherapy.
- Linalool
- Mandarin
- Marjoram
- Manuka oil
- Melissa oil (Lemon balm), sweet smelling oil
- Mentha arvensis oil, mint oil, used in flavoring toothpastes, mouthwashes and pharmaceuticals, as well as in aromatherapy.
- Moringa oil, can be used directly on the skin and hair. It can also be used in soap and as a base for other cosmetics.
- Mountain Savory
- Mugwort oil, used in ancient times for medicinal and magical purposes. Currently considered to be a neurotoxin.
- Mustard oil, containing a high percentage of allyl isothiocyanate or other isothiocyanates, depending on the species of mustard
- Myrrh oil, warm, slightly musty smell.
- Myrtle
- Neem oil or neem tree oil
- Neroli is produced from the blossom of the bitter orange tree.
- Nutmeg oil
- Orange oil, like lemon oil, cold pressed rather than distilled. Consists of 90% d-Limonene. Used as a fragrance, in cleaning products and in flavoring foods.
- Oregano oil, contains thymol and carvacrol
- Orris oil is extracted from the roots of the Florentine iris (Iris florentina), Iris germanica and Iris pallida. It is used as a flavouring agent, in perfume, and medicinally.
- Palo Santo
- Parsley oil, used in soaps, detergents, colognes, cosmetics and perfumes, especially men's fragrances.
- Patchouli oil, very common ingredient in perfumes.
- Perilla essential oil, extracted from the leaves of the perilla plant. Contains about 50–60% perillaldehyde.
- Pennyroyal oil, highly toxic. It is abortifacient and can even in small quantities cause acute liver and lung damage.
- Peppermint oil
- Petitgrain
- Pine oil, used as a disinfectant, and in aromatherapy.
- Ravensara
- Red Cedar
- Roman Chamomile
- Rose oil, distilled from rose petals, used primarily as a fragrance.
- Rosehip oil, distilled from the seeds of the Rosa rubiginosa or Rosa mosqueta.
- Rosemary oil, distilled from the flowers of Rosmarinus officinalis.
- Rosewood oil, used primarily for skin care applications.
- Sage oil,

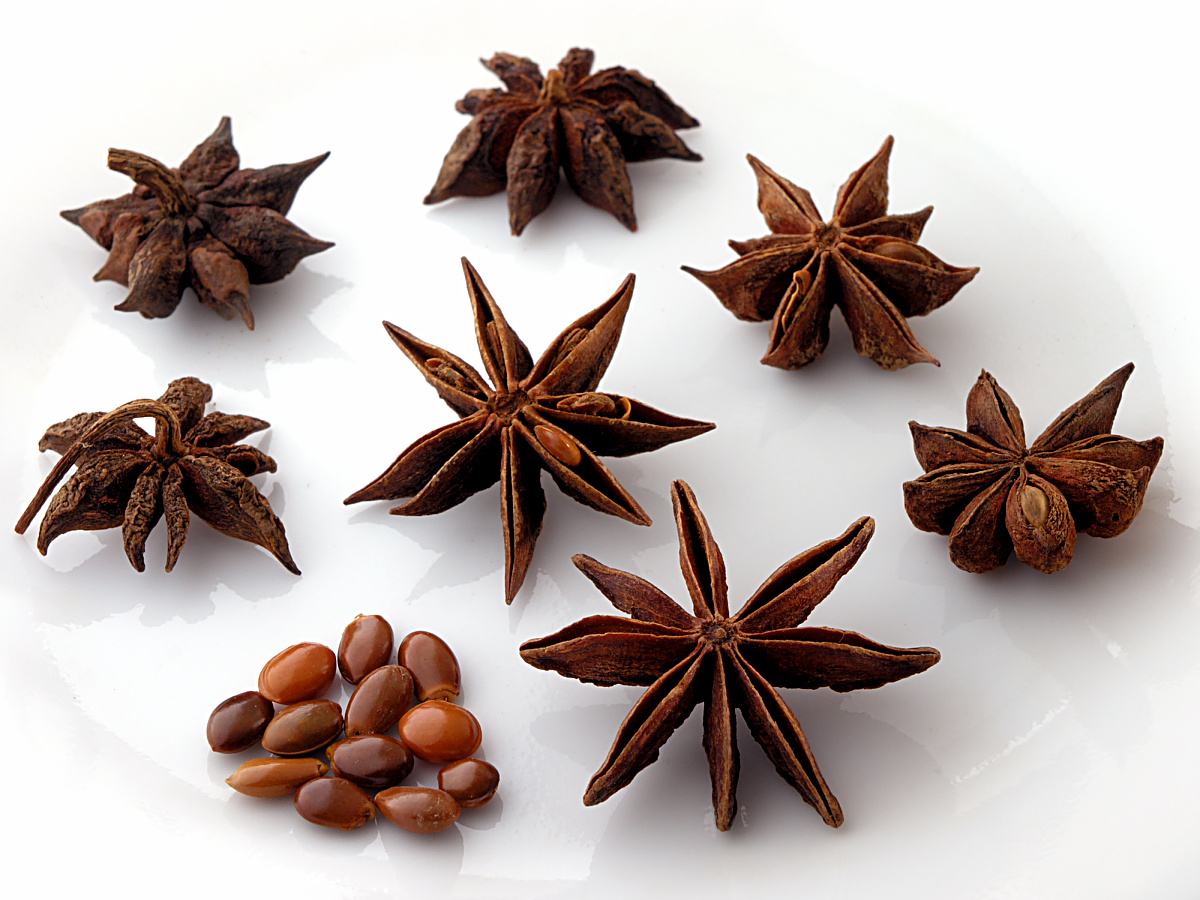
The spice star anise is distilled to make star anise oil

- Sandalwood oil, used primarily as a fragrance, for its pleasant, woody fragrance.
- Sassafras oil, from sassafras root bark. Used in aromatherapy, soap-making, perfumes, and the like. Formerly used as a spice, and as the primary flavoring of root beer, inter alia. Sassafras oil is heavily regulated in the United States due to its high safrole content.
- Savory oil, from Satureja species. Used in aromatherapy, cosmetic and soap-making applications.
- Schisandra oil
- Spearmint oil, often used in flavoring mouthwash and chewing gum, among other applications.
- Spikenard
- Spruce oil
- Star anise oil, highly fragrant oil using in cooking. Also used in perfumery and soaps, has been used in toothpastes, mouthwashes, and skin creams. 90% of the world's star anise crop is used in the manufacture of Tamiflu, a drug used to treat influenza, and is hoped to be useful for avian flu
- Tangerine
- Tarragon oil, distilled from Artemisia dracunculus
- Tea tree oil, extracted from Melaleuca alternifolia.
- Thyme oil
- Tsuga belongs to the pine tree family.
- Turmeric, used to flavor food.
- Valerian
- Warionia, used as a perfume ingredient
- Vetiver oil (khus oil) a thick, amber oil, primarily from India. Used as a fixative in perfumery, and in aromatherapy.
- Western red cedar
- Wintergreen
- Yarrow oil
- Ylang-ylang

== See also ==
- Eau de Cologne
- Perfume
- PiHKAL § Essential amphetamines

== Books ==
- Julia Lawless, The Illustrated Encyclopedia of Essential Oils: The Complete Guide to the Use of Oils in Aromatherapy and Herbalism (ISBN 1852307218) 1995
- The Complete Book of Essential Oils & Aromatherapy
