= Hôtel de Ville, Brunoy =

Town hall in Brunoy, France

Hôtel de Ville
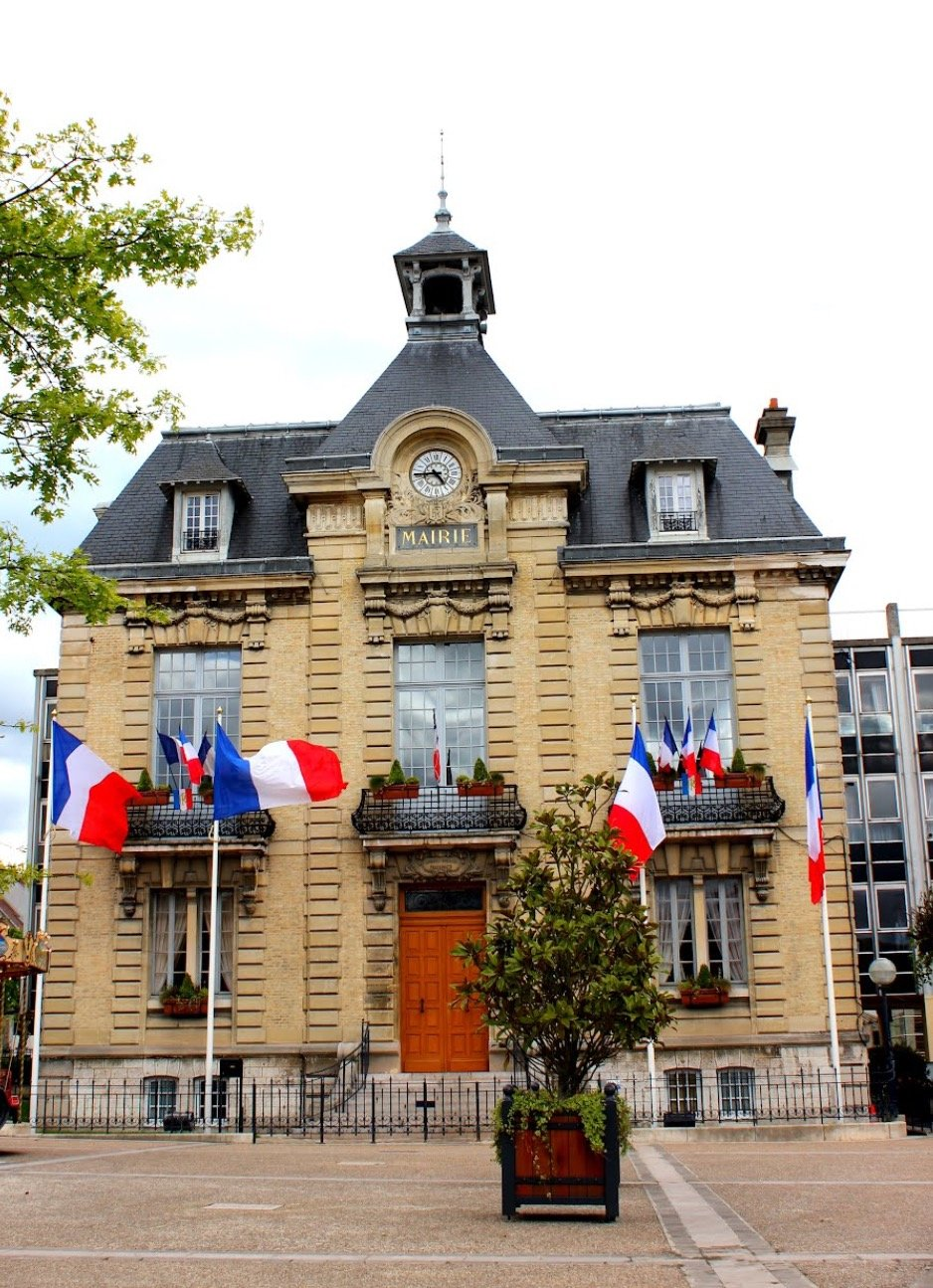
- The main frontage of the Hôtel de Ville in April 2017
- Interactive map of the Hôtel de Ville area

General information
- Type: City hall
- Architectural style: Neoclassical style
- Location: Brunoy, France
- Coordinates: 48.6979°N 2.5046°E
- Completed: 1898

Design and construction
- Architect: Sieur Breasson

The Hôtel de Ville (French pronunciation: [otɛl də vil], City Hall) is a municipal building in Brunoy, Essonne, in the southeastern suburbs of Paris, standing on Place de la Mairie.

== History ==
Following the French Revolution, a commune was established in Brunoy and a mayor, Louis Jacques Venteclef, was elected in December 1789. However, in October 1795, with the formation of the French Directory, the village was deemed too small to justify an elected mayor and a council. Instead, mayors with limited powers were appointed by the prefect. This arrangement continued until April 1884 when a mayor and councillors were elected again. In the early 1890s, the elected council led by the mayor, Ernest Gervaise, decided to commission a town hall. The site they selected was an area which, in the mid-17th century, was known as "Carrefour de Brie". In the late 18th century, it was bordered by the buildings of the bailiwick of the Duchy of Brunoy, which had been created for the Duke of Provence, in 1777. By that time the area was known as "Place de la Jeunesse".

The new building was designed by Sieur Breasson in the neoclassical style, built in ashlar stone and was completed in 1898. The design involved a symmetrical main frontage of three bays facing onto Place de la Mairie. The central bay featured a short flight of steps leading up to a square headed doorway with a rectangular fanlight and an ornate keystone. There was a French door surmounted by garlands and fronted by a balcony on the first floor, and a clock above. Behind the clock, there was a steep roof which was surmounted by a square belfry. The other bays were fenestrated by mullioned windows with double keystones on the ground floor, and by French doors with garlands and balconies on the first floor. The windows and bays were all flanked by quoins. Internally, the principal room was the Salle des Mariages (wedding room).

Following the death of the former president of France, Charles de Gaulle, in November 1970, a commemorative stone with a bronze depiction of his face was installed in the garden of the town hall. Also in the 1970s, a long rectangular administration centre was erected behind the town hall.

In March 2010, a reception was held in the town hall to commemorate the work of the former mayors of the town, Henri Devarenne and Jean Doinel, who served with the French Resistance during the Second World War. Plaques were also unveiled in squares in the town which were renamed in their honour. An extensive programme of works, involving the refurbishment of the wedding room and the installation of a new stairlift, was completed to a design by Pascal Sallet in January 2018.
