= Baby colic =

Colic
- Other names: Infantile colic
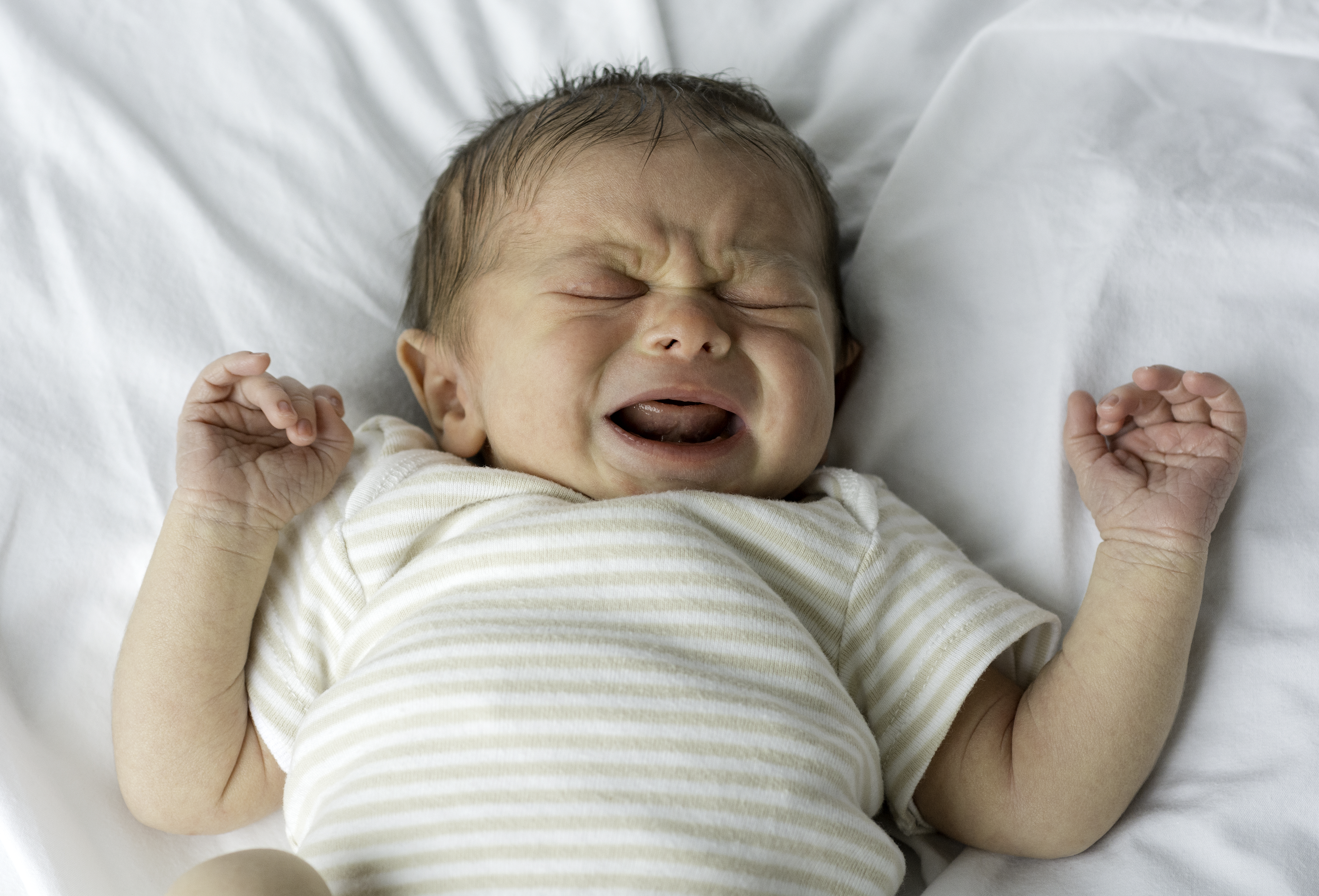
- A crying newborn
- Specialty: Pediatrics
- Symptoms: Crying for more than three hours a day, for more than three days a week, for three weeks
- Complications: Frustration for the parents, depression following delivery, child abuse
- Usual onset: Six weeks of age
- Duration: Typically goes away by six months of age
- Causes: Unknown
- Diagnostic method: Based on symptoms after ruling out other possible causes
- Differential diagnosis: Corneal abrasion, hair tourniquet, hernia, testicular torsion
- Treatment: Conservative treatment, extra support for the parents
- Prognosis: No long term problems
- Frequency: ~25% of babies

Baby colic, also known as infantile colic, is defined as episodes of crying for more than three hours a day, for more than three days a week, for three weeks in an otherwise healthy child. Often crying occurs in the evening. It typically does not result in long-term problems. The crying can result in frustration for the parents, depression following delivery, excessive visits to the doctor, and child abuse.

The cause of colic is unknown. Some believe it is due to gastrointestinal discomfort like intestinal cramping. Diagnosis requires ruling out other possible causes. Concerning findings include a fever, poor activity, or a swollen abdomen. Fewer than 5% of infants with excess crying have an underlying organic disease.

Treatment is generally conservative, with little to no role for either medications or alternative therapies. Extra support for the parents may be useful. Tentative evidence supports certain probiotics for the baby and a low-allergen diet by the mother in those who are breastfed. Hydrolyzed formula may be useful in those who are bottlefed.

Colic affects 10–40% of babies. Equally common in bottle and breast-fed infants, it begins during the second week of life, peaks at 6 weeks, and resolves between 12 and 16 weeks. It rarely lasts up to one year of age. It occurs at the same rate in boys and in girls. The first detailed medical description of the problem was published in 1954.

== Signs and symptoms ==
Colic is defined as episodes of crying for more than three hours a day, for more than three days a week for at least a three-week duration in an otherwise healthy child. It is most common around six weeks of age and gets better by six months of age. By contrast, infants normally cry an average of just over two hours a day, with the duration peaking at six weeks. With colic, periods of crying most commonly happen in the evening and for no obvious reason. Associated symptoms may include legs pulled up to the stomach, a flushed face, clenched hands, and a wrinkled brow. The cry is often high pitched (piercing).

=== Effect on the family ===
An infant with colic may affect family stability and be a cause of short-term anxiety or depression in the parent(s). It may also contribute to exhaustion and stress in the parent(s).

Persistent infant crying has been associated with severe marital discord, postpartum depression, early termination of breastfeeding, frequent visits to doctors, a quadrupling of laboratory tests, and prescription of medication for acid reflux. Babies with colic may be exposed to abuse, especially shaken baby syndrome.

Parent training programs for managing infantile colic may result in a reduction in crying time.

== Causes ==
The cause of colic is generally unknown. Fewer than 5% of infants who cry excessively turn out to have an underlying organic disease, such as constipation, gastroesophageal reflux disease, lactose intolerance, anal fissures, subdural hematomas, or infantile migraine. Babies fed cow's milk have been shown to develop antibody responses to the bovine protein, and some studies have shown an association between consumption of cow's milk and infant colic. Studies performed showed conflicting evidence about the role of cow's milk allergy. While previously believed to be related to gas pains, this does not appear to be the case. Another theory holds that colic is related to hyperperistalsis of the digestive tube (increased level of activity of contraction and relaxation). The evidence that the use of anticholinergic agents improve colic symptoms supports this hypothesis.

Psychological and social factors have been proposed as a cause, but there is no evidence. Studies performed do not support the theory that maternal (or paternal) personality or anxiety causes colic, nor that it is a consequence of a difficult temperament of the baby, but families with colicky children may eventually develop anxiety, fatigue and problems with family functioning as a result. There is some evidence that cigarette smoke may increase the risk. It seems unrelated to breast or bottle feeding with rates similar in both groups. Reflux does not appear to be related to colic. In the ICD-11, which has been in effect since 2022, excessive crying in infancy is recorded as a separate code under the heading "Unusually frequent and intense crying in infancy and early childhood" (MG44.0). "Infancy or toddler colic" (DD93.1) is classified as a functional disorder.

== Diagnosis ==
Colic is diagnosed after other potential causes of crying are excluded. This can typically be done via a history and physical exam, and in most cases tests such as X-rays or blood tests are not needed. Babies who cry may simply be hungry, uncomfortable, or ill. Less than 10% of babies who would meet the definition of colic based on the amount they cry have an identifiable underlying disease.

Cause for concern include: an elevated temperature, a history of breathing problems or a child who is not appropriately gaining weight.

Indications that further investigations may be needed include:

- Vomiting (vomit that is green or yellow, bloody or occurring more than five times a day)
- Change in stool (constipation or diarrhea, especially with blood or mucus)
- Abnormal temperature (a rectal temperature less than 97.0 °F (36.1 °C) or over 100.4 °F (38.0 °C)
- Irritability (crying all day with few calm periods in between)
- Lethargy (excess sleepiness, lack of smiles or interested gaze, weak sucking lasting over six hours)
- Poor weight gain (gaining less than 15 grams a day)

Problems to consider when the above are present include:

- Infections (e.g. ear infection, urine infection, meningitis, appendicitis)
- Intestinal pain (e.g. food allergy, acid reflux, constipation, intestinal blockage)
- Trouble breathing (e.g. from a cold, excessive dust, congenital nasal blockage, oversized tongue)
- Increased brain pressure (e.g. hematoma, hydrocephalus)
- Skin pain (e.g. a loose diaper pin, irritated rash, a hair wrapped around a toe)
- Mouth pain (e.g. yeast infection)
- Kidney pain (e.g. blockage of the urinary system)
- Eye pain (e.g. scratched cornea, glaucoma)
- Overdose (e.g. excessive Vitamin D, excessive sodium)
- Others (e.g. migraine headache, heart failure, hyperthyroidism)

Persistently fussy babies with poor weight gain, vomiting more than five times a day, or other significant feeding problems should be evaluated for other illnesses (e.g. urinary infection, intestinal obstruction, acid reflux).

== Treatment ==
Management of colic is generally conservative and involves the reassurance of parents. Calming measures may be used and include soothing motions, limiting stimulation, pacifier use, and carrying the baby around in a carrier, although it is not entirely clear if these actions have any effect beyond placebo. Swaddling does not appear to help.

=== Medication ===
No medications have been found to be both safe and effective. Simethicone is safe but ineffective, while dicyclomine works but is unsafe. Evidence does not support the use of cimetropium bromide, and there is little evidence for alternative medications or techniques. While medications to treat reflux are common, there is no evidence that they are useful. Doses of Lactase taken orally along with milk may help.

=== Diet ===
Dietary changes by infants are generally not needed. In mothers who are breastfeeding, a hypoallergenic diet by the mother—not eating milk and dairy products, eggs, wheat, and nuts—may improve matters, while elimination of only cow's milk does not seem to produce any improvement. In formula-fed infants, switching to a soy-based or hydrolyzed protein formula may help. Evidence of benefit is greater for hydrolyzed protein formula with the benefit from soy based formula being disputed. Both these formulas have greater cost and may not be as palatable. Supplementation with fiber has not been shown to have any benefit. A 2018 Cochrane review of 15 randomized controlled trials involving 1,121 infants was unable to recommend any dietary interventions. A 2019 review determined that probiotics were no more effective than placebo although a reduction in crying time was measured.

=== Complementary and alternative medicine ===
No clear beneficial effect from spinal manipulation or massage has been shown. Further, as there is no evidence of safety for cervical manipulation for baby colic, it is not advised. There is a case of a three-month-old dying following manipulation of the neck area.

Little clinical evidence supports the efficacy of "gripe water." Evidence does not support lactase supplementation. The use of probiotics, specifically Lactobacillus reuteri, decreases crying time at three weeks by 46 minutes in breastfeed babies but has unclear effects in those who are formula fed. Fennel also appears effective.

== Prognosis ==
Infants who are colicky do just as well as their non colicky peers with respect to temperament at one year of age.

== Epidemiology ==
Colic affects 10–40% of children, occurring at the same rate in boys and in girls.

== History ==
The word "colic" is derived from the ancient Greek word for intestine (sharing the same root as the word "colon").

It has been an age-old practice to drug crying infants. During the second century AD, the Greek physician Galen prescribed opium to calm fussy babies, and during the Middle Ages in Europe, mothers and wet nurses smeared their nipples with opium lotions before each feeding. Alcohol was also commonly given to infants.
