= Garlic oil =

Volatile oil derived from garlic

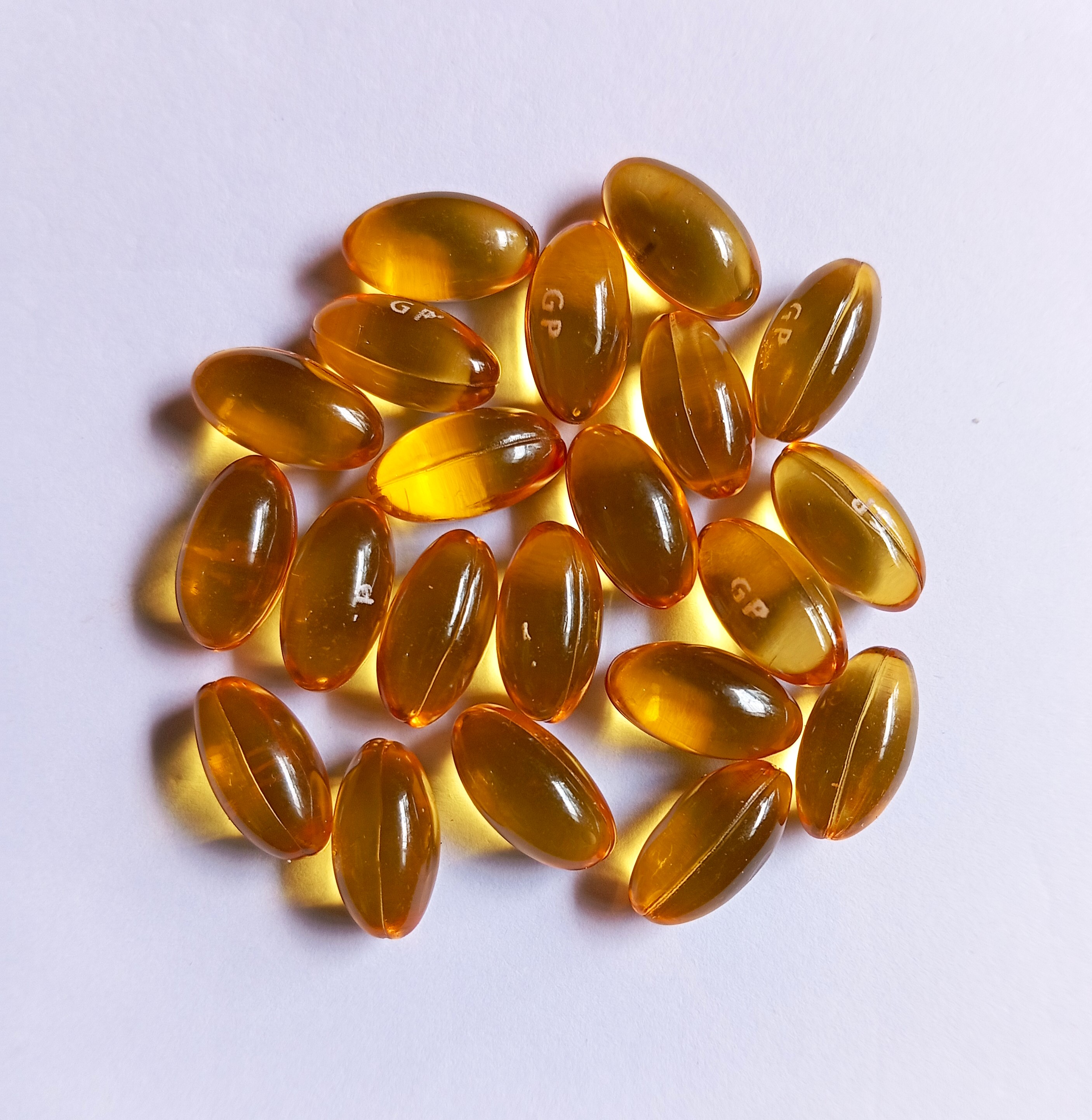
Garlic oil capsules

Garlic oil is the volatile oil derived from garlic. It is usually prepared using steam distillation, and can also be produced via distillation using ether. It is used in cooking and as a seasoning, a nutritional supplement, and also as an insecticide.

== Preparation ==
Garlic oil is typically prepared using steam distillation, where crushed garlic is steamed with the resultant condensation containing the oil. Garlic oil contains volatile sulfur compounds such as diallyl disulfide, a 60% constituent of the oil. Steam-distilled garlic oil typically has a pungent and disagreeable odor and a brownish-yellow color. Its odor has been attributed to the presence of diallyl disulfide. To produce around 1 gram of pure steam-distilled garlic oil, around 500 grams of garlic is required. Undiluted garlic oil has 900 times the strength of fresh garlic, and 200 times the strength of dehydrated garlic.

Ether can also be used to extract garlic oil. Another type of garlic oil involves soaking diced or crushed garlic in vegetable oil, but this is not pure garlic oil; rather it is a garlic-infused oil.

== Uses ==
Garlic oil is used as a dietary supplement or digestive aid commonly sold in capsules, which may be diluted with other ingredients. Some commercial preparations are produced with various levels of dilution, such as a preparation that contains 10% garlic oil. There is no clinical research confirming health effects of consuming garlic oil.

Stabilized garlic flavor blend is a proprietary mixture of dehydrated garlic powder infused with garlic oil, which increases the flavor of the garlic powder.

Garlic oil can be used as an insecticide, diluted with water and sprayed on plants.

== Potential adverse effects ==
Common adverse effects of consuming garlic, garlic oil, and garlic supplements are breath and body odor, abdominal pain, nausea, vomiting, and other symptoms of gastrointestinal disorders. Garlic oil consumption may have anticoagulant effects in some people, causing bleeding, and may interfere with prescription drugs.

== Garlic-flavored oil ==
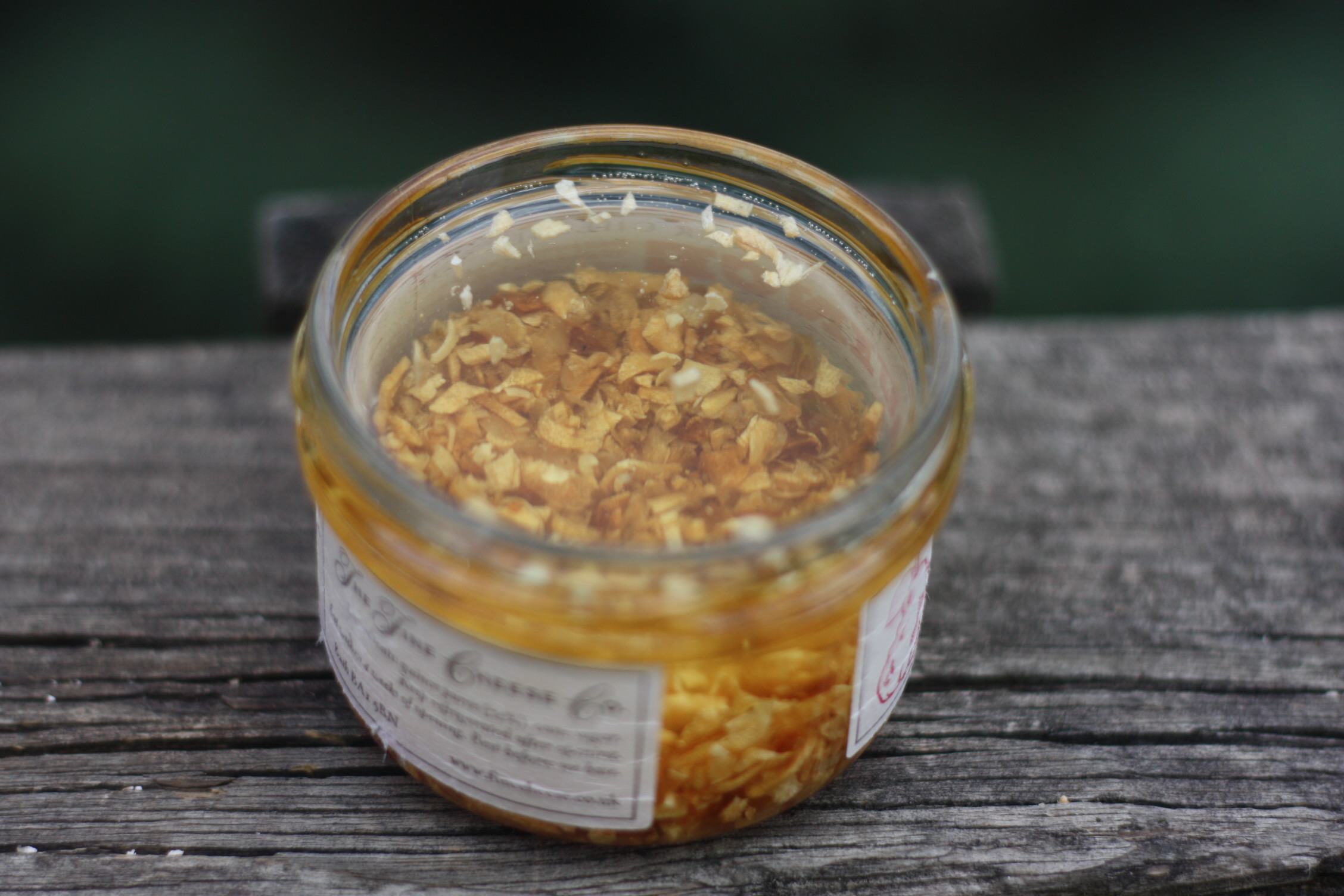
Garlic-flavored oil: vegetable oil infused with garlic used for seasoning

Garlic-flavored oil is produced and used for cooking and seasoning purposes, and is sometimes used as an ingredient in seasoning mixtures. This differs from essential garlic oil, and typically involves the use of chopped, macerated or crushed garlic placed in various vegetable oils to flavor the oil.

== See also ==
- Garlic sauce
- List of essential oils
- List of garlic dishes
