= Garland =

Decorative wreath or cord, used at festive occasions

A garland is a decorative braid, knot or wreath of flowers, leaves, or other material. Garlands can be worn on the head or around the neck, hung on an inanimate object, or laid in a place of cultural or religious importance. In contemporary times, garlands are used to decorate, especially around holidays.

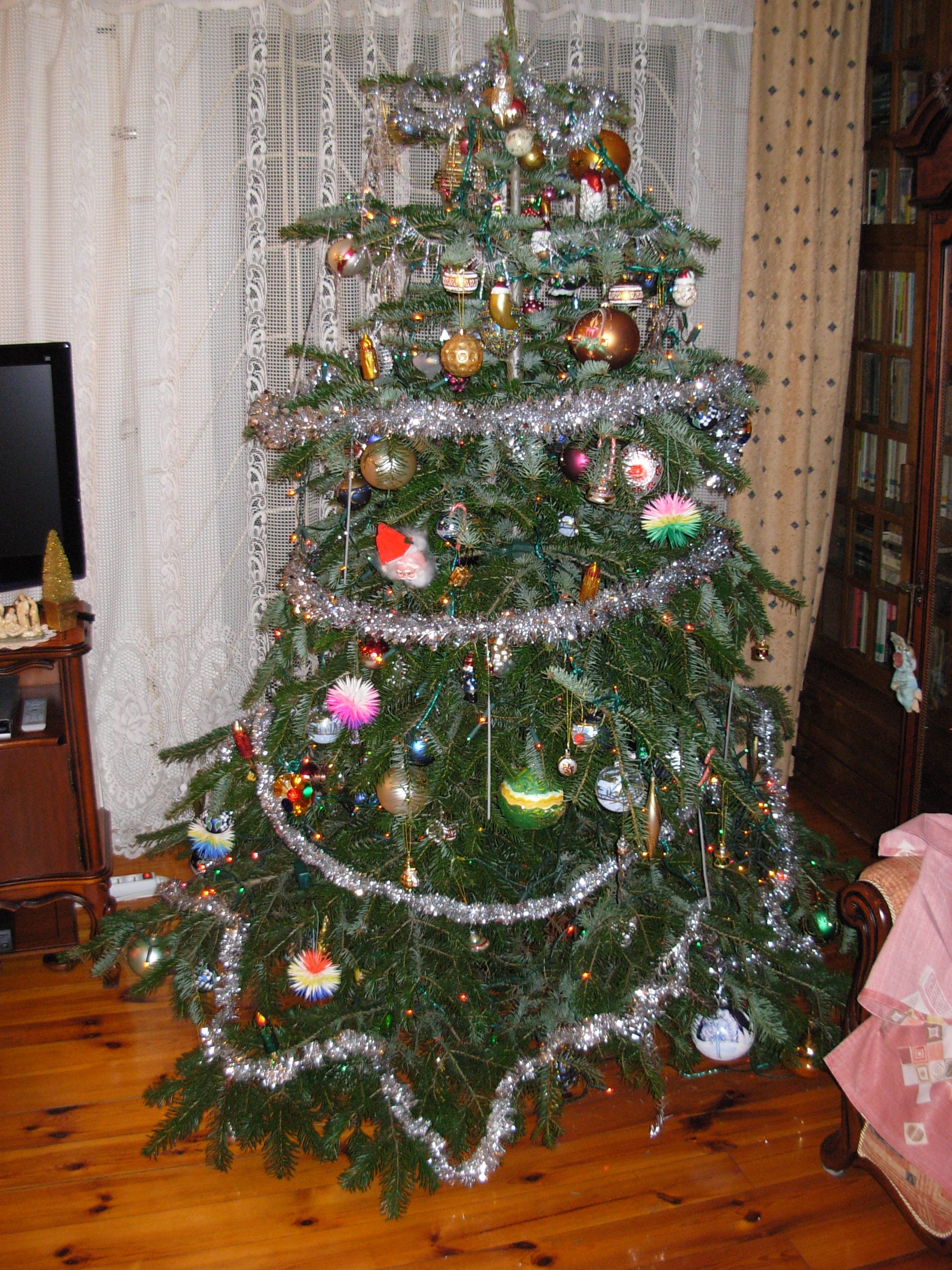
Tinsel garlands on a Christmas tree

== Etymology ==
From the French guirlande, itself from the Italian ghirlanda, a braid.

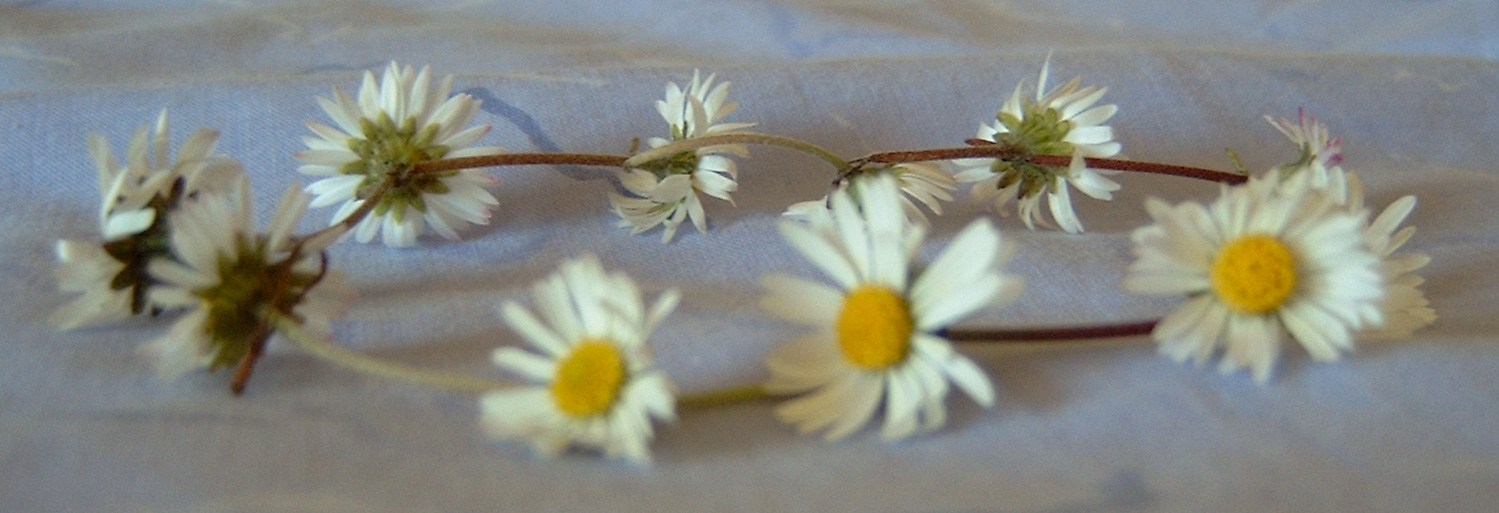
A daisy chain

== Types ==
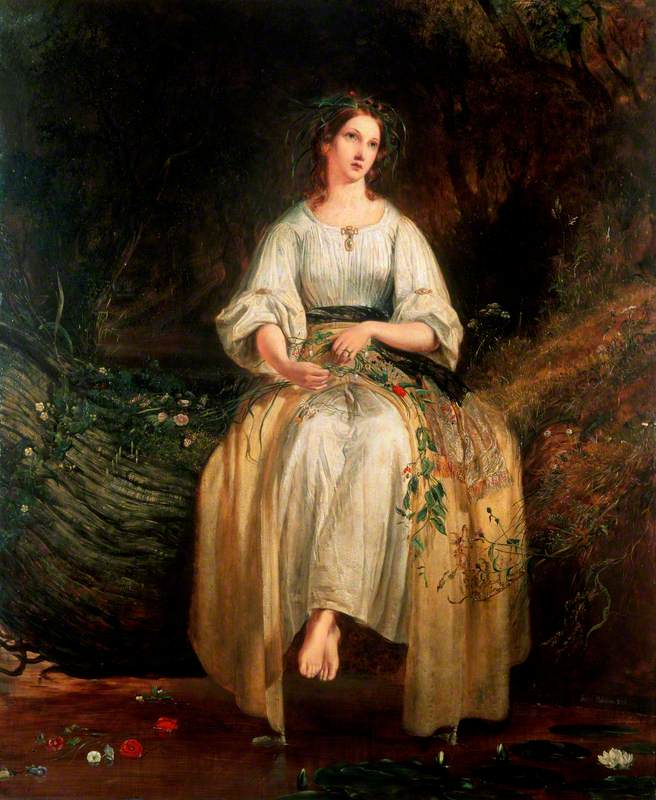
Ophelia Weaving Her Garlands by Richard Redgrave, 1842

- Bead garland
- Flower garland
  - Lei – The traditional garland of Hawaiʻi.
  - Daisy chain – A garland created from the daisy flower (generally as a children's game) is called a daisy chain. One method of creating a daisy chain is to pick daisies and create a hole towards the base of the stem (such as with fingernails or by tying a knot). The stem of the next flower can be threaded through until stopped by the head of the flower. By repeating this with many daisies, it is possible to build up long chains and to form them into simple bracelets and necklaces. Another popular method involves pressing the flower heads against each other to create a look similar to a caterpillar. In Alice's Adventures in Wonderland by Lewis Carroll, before Alice's adventures begin, she is seen sitting outside with her sister considering whether to make a daisy chain, before being interrupted by a White Rabbit. The terms "daisy chain" or "daisy chaining" can also refer to various technical and social "chains".
- Pennant garland
- Pine garland
- Popcorn and/or cranberry garland
- Rope garland
- Tinsel garland
- Vine garland
- Balloon garland
- Mundamala – Garland of severed heads or skulls, found in Hindu and Tibetan Buddhist iconography.

== Regional practices ==
=== Indian subcontinent ===
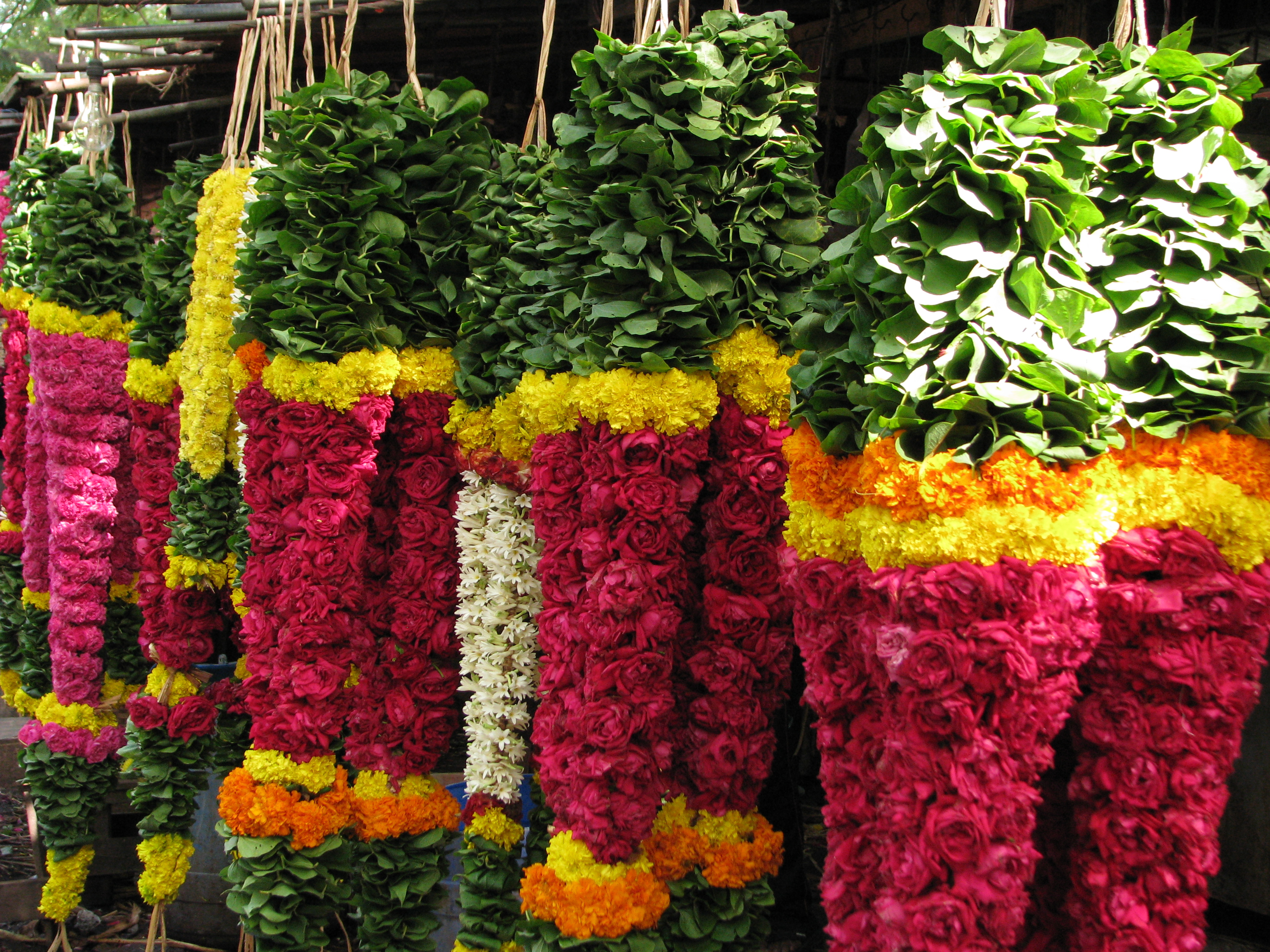
Heavy flower garlands for sale in Chennai, India

In countries of the Indian subcontinent, such as India and Pakistan, people may place garland around the necks of guests of honour, as a way of showing respect to them. Garlands are worn by the bridegroom in South Asian weddings.

==== India ====
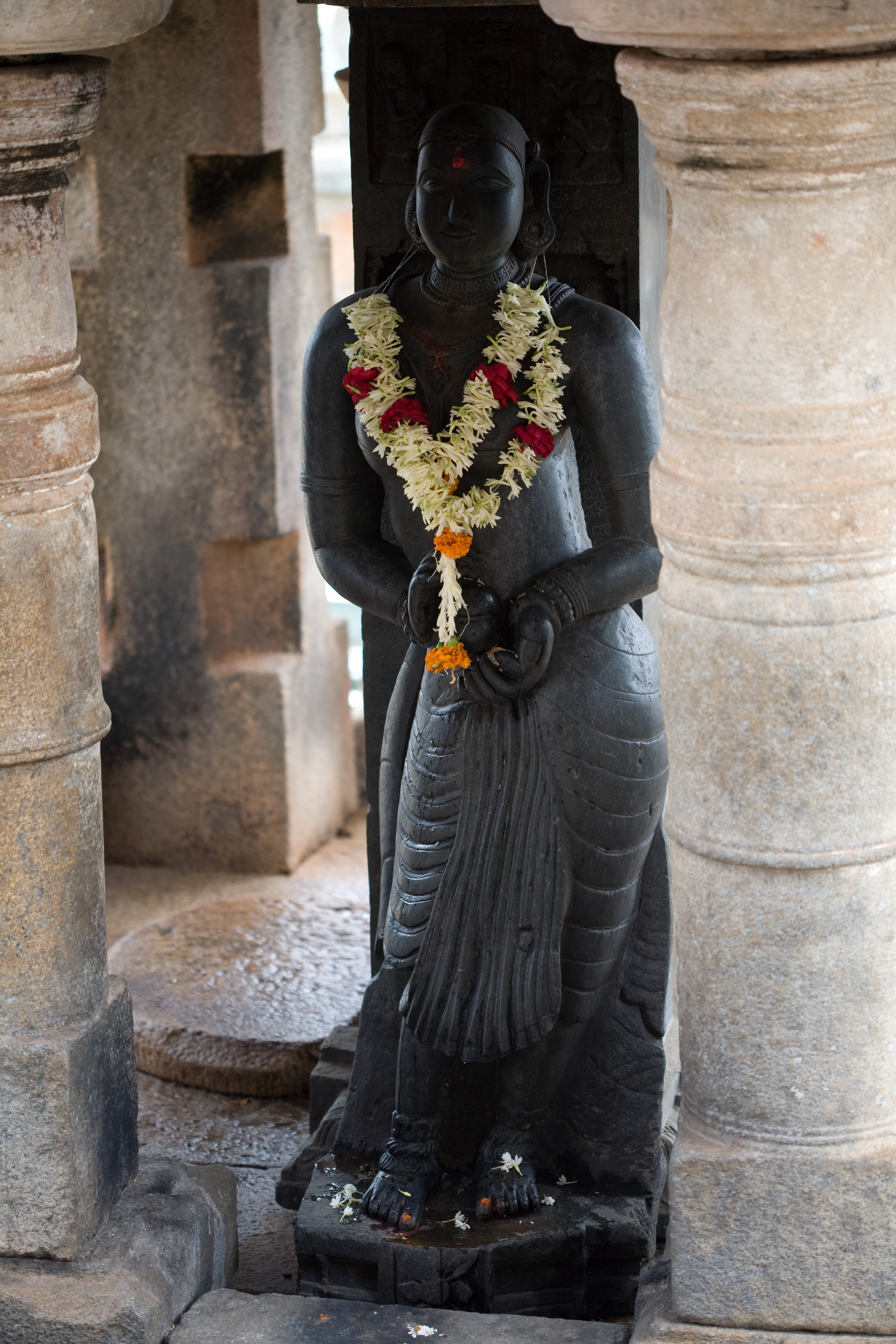
A garlanded image of Devi at the Jain temple of Sravanbelagola

Garlands were historically purely secular at first, sought for their fragrance and beauty and used for decorating houses, roads, and streets. It is eventually applied to Hindu deities as an important and traditional role in every festival where these garlands are made using different fragrant flowers (often jasmine) and leaves. Both fragrant and non-fragrant flowers and religiously-significant leaves are used to make garlands to worship Hindu deities. Some popular flowers include:

- jasmine
- champaka
- lotus
- lily
- ashoka
- nerium/oleander
- chrysanthemum
- rose
- hibiscus
- pinwheel flower
- manoranjini, etc.

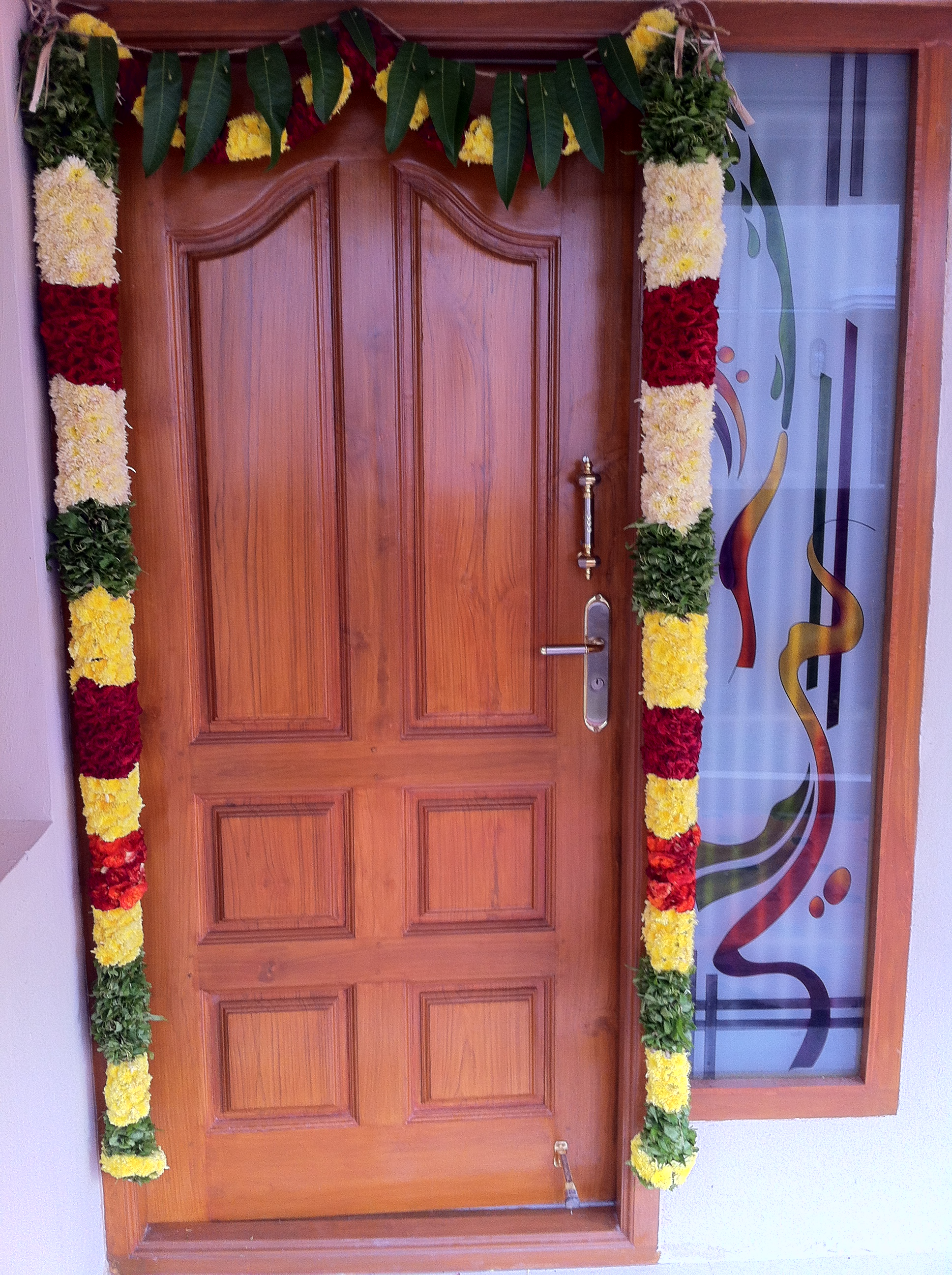
House main door frame decorated with door frame garland (Nila Maalai) during a Housewarming party in Tamil Nadu

Apart from these, leaves and grasses like arugampul, maruvakam, davanam, maachi, paneer leaves, lavancha are also used for making garlands. Fruit, vegetables, and sometimes even currency notes are also used for garlands, given as thanksgiving.

Wedding ceremonies in India include the bride and groom wearing a wedding garland. On other occasions, garlands are given as a sign of respect to an individual person or to a divine image.

A gajra is a flower garland which women in India and Bangladesh wear in their hair during traditional festivals. It is commonly made with jasmine. It can be worn around a bun, as well as in braids. Women usually wear these when they wear sarees. Sometimes, they are pinned in the hair with other flowers, such as roses.

===== South India =====
In ancient times, Tamil kings employed people to manufacture garlands daily for a particular deity. These garlands were not available for public consumption.

In contemporary times, each Hindu temple in southern India has a nandavanam (flower garden) where flowers and trees for garlands are grown. Large Shiva temples like Thillai Nataraja Temple, Chidambaram, Thyagaraja Temple, Tiruvarur, and Arunachaleswara Temple, and those found in Thiruvannamalai still preserve such nandavanams for supplying flowers for daily rituals.

Stone inscriptions of Rajaraja I at Thanjavur gives details of patronage bestowed by royals to the conservation of nadavanams that belonged to the "Big Temple".

Marigold and nitya kalyani garlands are used only for corpses in burial rituals. At social functions, garlands are used to denote the host.

At Srirangam Ranganathar temple, only garlands made by temple sattharars (brahmacaris employed for garland-making) are used to adorn the deity Ranganatha. Garland and flowers from outside the temple grounds are forbidden. Sattarars have several disciplinary rules for many aspects of their profession, some of which include:

- Flowers should be picked in the early morning.
- Flowers should not be smelled by anyone.
- Flowers should be picked only after one has bathed.
- The flowers which fallen from the plant and touched the ground should not be used.
- Namajapam, or the repetition of holy names, should be done while picking flowers.

While making garlands, the sattarars keep flowers and other materials on a table in order to keep them away from the feet, which are traditionally viewed as unclean and unfit for use in a religious context. Material is always kept above hip level.

South Indian garlands are of different types. Some of them are as follows:

- Thodutha maalai – Garlands made from the fiber of the banana tree (vaazhainaar). Common in marriage ceremonies and devotional offerings. In all Hindu marriages the bride and bridegroom exchange garlands three times. These garlands range in length from 0.5 to 3.7 m (1 1/2 to 12 ft) and vary from 5 cm (2 in) to 0.9–1.2 m (3–4 ft) in diameter.
- Kortha maalai – Made using needle and thread. Jasmine, mullai, and lotus garlands are made using this method. Malas for the gods have two free lower ends with kunjam (bunch of flowers), i.e. only the upper two ends are joined and the lower ends should not be not joined. They have two kunjams, whereas garlands for human use have both lower ends joined (only one kunjam).

Each Hindu deity has a unique garland:

- Lalitha wears hibiscus
- Vishnu wears tulasi leaves
- Shiva wears bilva leaves
- Subrahmanya wears jasmine
- Lakshmi wears red lotus
- Sarasvati wears white lotus
- Durga wears nerium oleander
- Vinayaka wears dūrvā grass
- Hanuman wears Tagetes erecta

The tradition of garlanding statues as a sign of respect extends to respected non-divine beings, including ancient King Perumbidugu Mutharaiyar II and the innovative colonial administrator Mark Cubbon.

==== Nepal ====
A reference to a garland is found in the Nepalese national anthem, Sayaun Thunga Phulka. The first line reads, "Woven from hundreds of flowers, we are one garland that's Nepali."

=== Christendom ===
In Christian countries, garlands are often used as Christmas decorations, such as being wrapped around a Christmas tree.

== See also ==
- Angulimala
- Chaplet (headgear)
- Festoon
- Japamala
- Lei
- Phuang malai
