= Cimetropium bromide =

Chemical compound

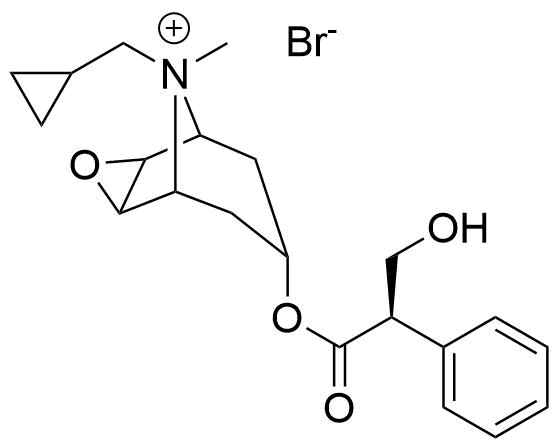

Clinical data
- ATC code: A03BB05 (WHO)

Identifiers
- IUPAC name: 9-Cyclopropylmethyl-7-(3-hydroxy-2-phenyl-propionyloxy)-9-methyl-3-oxa-9-azonia-tricyclo[3.3.1.02,4
- CAS Number: 51598-60-8
- PubChem CID: 6917944
- ChemSpider: 16735742
- UNII: 0C7M5WE60Q
- KEGG: D07099
- ChEMBL: ChEMBL2105977
- CompTox Dashboard (EPA): DTXSID10965919
- ECHA InfoCard: 100.169.259

Chemical and physical data
- Formula: C_{21}H_{28}BrNO_{4}
- Molar mass: 438.362 g·mol^{−1}
- 3D model (JSmol): Interactive image
- SMILES: C[N+]1([C@@H]2CC(C[C@H]1[C@H]3[C@@H]2O3)OC(=O)[C@@H](CO)C4=CC=CC=C4)CC5CC5.[Br-]
- InChI: InChI=1S/C21H28NO4.BrH/c1-22(11-13-7-8-13)17-9-15(10-18(22)20-19(17)26-20)25-21(24)16(12-23)14-5-3-2-4-6-14;/h2-6,13,15-20,23H,7-12H2,1H3;1H/q+1;/p-1/t15?,16-,17-,18+,19-,20+,22?;/m0./s1; Key:WDURTRGFUGAJHA-MMQBYREUSA-M

Cimetropium bromide is a semisynthetic quaternary ammonium compound derived from reacting scopolamine (an alkaloid isolated from belladonna) with cyclopropylmethyl bromide. It is used primarily as an antispasmodic agent for the treatment of gastrointestinal disorders such as irritable bowel syndrome (IBS). Acting as a potent muscarinic receptor antagonist, it inhibits acetylcholine-mediated contractions in the smooth muscle of the digestive tract, thereby reducing spasms and alleviating abdominal pain. Cimetropium bromide demonstrates efficacy in long-term management of IBS symptoms with a favorable tolerability profile and is generally administered orally. Its peripheral antimuscarinic effects are similar to those of atropine but typically result in fewer or milder central nervous system side effects.

Evidence does not support its use in infantile colic.

== Physicochemical properties ==
Feature	Value
Number of Hydrogen Acceptors	4
The number of hydrogen donors	1
Number of Rotational Connections	7
Partition coefficient (-{ALogP)}-	-2,1
Solubility (-{logS, log(mol/L}-))	-3,6
Polar surface (-{PSA}-, Å^{2})	102,1
