= Dill oil =

Essential oil extracted from dill leaves, stems, and seeds

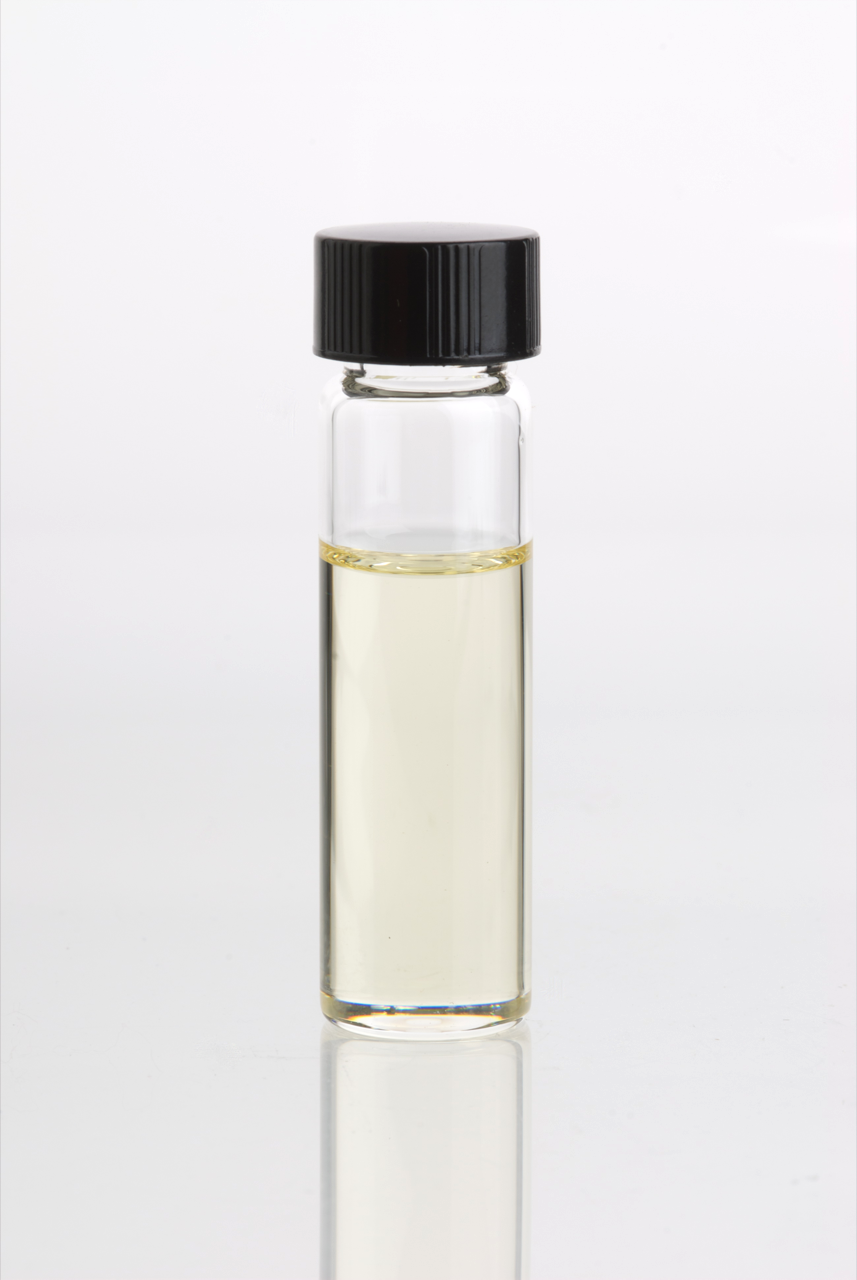
A glass vial containing pure Dill essential oil

Dill oil is an essential oil extracted from the seeds or leaves/stems (dillweed) of the Dill plant. It can be used with water to create dill water. Dill (Anethum graveolens) is an annual herb in the celery family Apiaceae. It is the sole species of the genus Anethum.

== Origin ==
Also known as Indian Dill, originally from Southwest Asia, Dill is an annual or biennial herb that grows up to 1 meter (3 feet). It has green feathery leaves and umbels of small yellow flowers, followed by tiny compressed seeds.

It was popular with the Egyptians, Greeks and Romans, who called it "Anethon" from which the botanical name was derived. The common name comes from the Anglo-Saxon dylle or dylla, which then changed to dill. The word means 'to lull' – referring to its soothing properties. In the Middle Ages it was used as a charm against witchcraft.

From 812 onwards, when Charlemagne, King of the Franks, Emperor of the Romans, ordered the extensive cultivation of this herb, it has been widely used, especially, as a culinary herb.

== Properties ==
Dill oil is known for its grass-like smell and its pale yellow color, with a watery viscosity.

== Production ==
Dill oil is extracted by steam distillation, mainly from the seeds, or the whole herb, fresh or partly dried.
