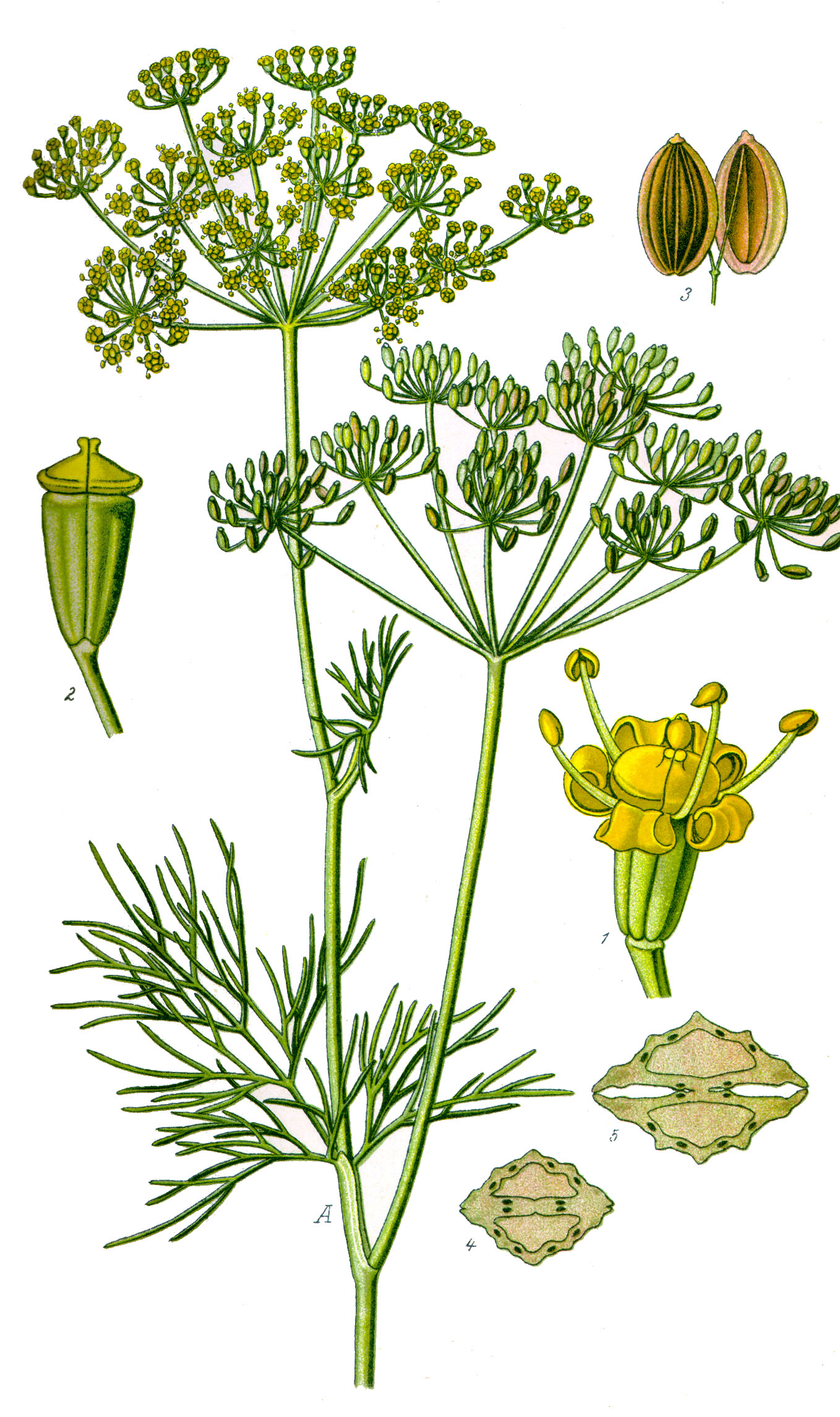
- 19th-century botanical illustration of Anethum graveolens

Scientific classification
- Kingdom: Plantae
- Clade: Tracheophytes
- Clade: Angiosperms
- Clade: Eudicots
- Clade: Asterids
- Order: Apiales
- Family: Apiaceae
- Subfamily: Apioideae
- Tribe: Apieae
- Genus: Anethum; L.

Species
- Anethum graveolens L.; Anethum theurkauffii Maire

= Anethum =

Herb genus

Anethum is a flowering plant genus in the family Apiaceae, native to the Middle East and the Sahara in northern Africa.

== Taxonomy ==
The genus name comes from the Latin form of Greek words ἄνῑσον anison, ἄνησον anīson, ἄνηθον anīthon and ἄνητον anīton, which all meant "dill" and "anise"; anise is now placed in a different genus named Pimpinella.

== Species ==
There are 2 recognized species in this genus, they are:

- Anethum graveolens L. – dill
- Anethum theurkauffii Maire
