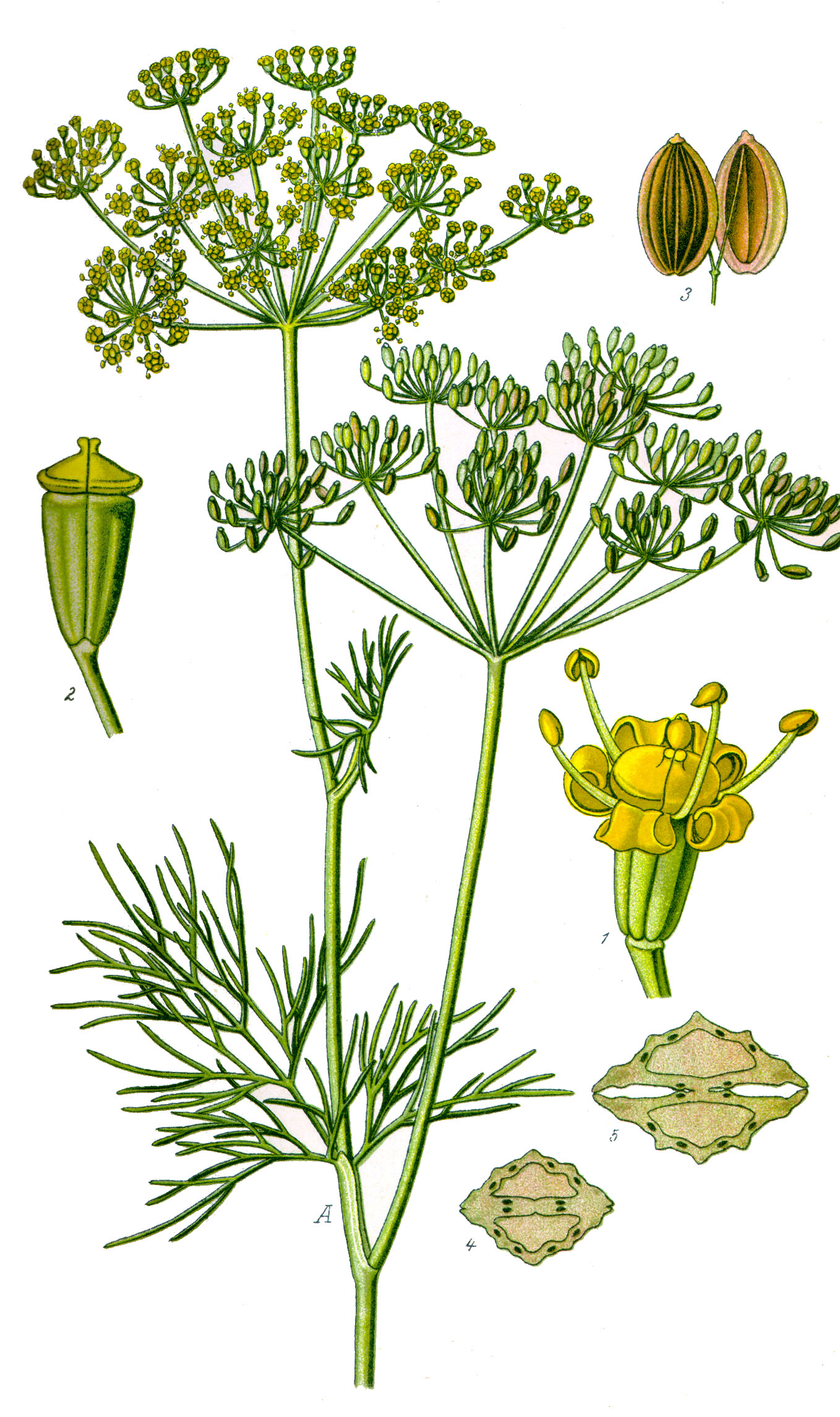
- 19th-century botanical illustration

Scientific classification
- Kingdom: Plantae
- Clade: Tracheophytes
- Clade: Angiosperms
- Clade: Eudicots
- Clade: Asterids
- Order: Apiales
- Family: Apiaceae
- Genus: Anethum
- Species: A. graveolens

Binomial name
- Anethum graveolens L.

Synonyms
- Synonymy: Anethum arvense Salisb.; Angelica graveolens (L.) Steud.; Ferula graveolens (L.) Spreng.; Pastinaca anethum Spreng.; Peucedanum anethum Jess.; Peucedanum graveolens (L.) Hiern; Peucedanum sowa (Roxb. ex Fleming) Kurz; Selinum anethum Roth; Selinum graveolens (L.) Vest

= Dill =

Species of flowering plant in the celery family

Dill (Anethum graveolens) is an annual herb in the celery family Apiaceae. Native to North Africa and West Asia, dill is grown widely in Eurasia, where its leaves and seeds are used as a herb or spice for flavouring food.

== Description ==
Growing from a taproot like a carrot, dill grows up to 0.5–1.5 metres (1 1/2–5 feet) tall. Its stems are slender and hollow with finely divided, softly delicate leaves; the leaves are alternately arranged, 10–20 centimetres (4–8 inches) long with ultimate leaf divisions measuring 1–2 millimetres (1/32–3/32 in) broad, slightly wider than the similar leaves of fennel, which are less than 1 mm (1/16 in) across but harder in texture.

In hot or dry weather, small white to yellow scented flowers form in small umbels 2.5–9 cm (1–3 1/2 in) in diameter from one long stalk. The seeds come from dried up fruit 4–5 mm (3/16–3/16 in) long and 1 mm (1/16 in) thick, and straight to slightly curved with a longitudinally ridged surface.

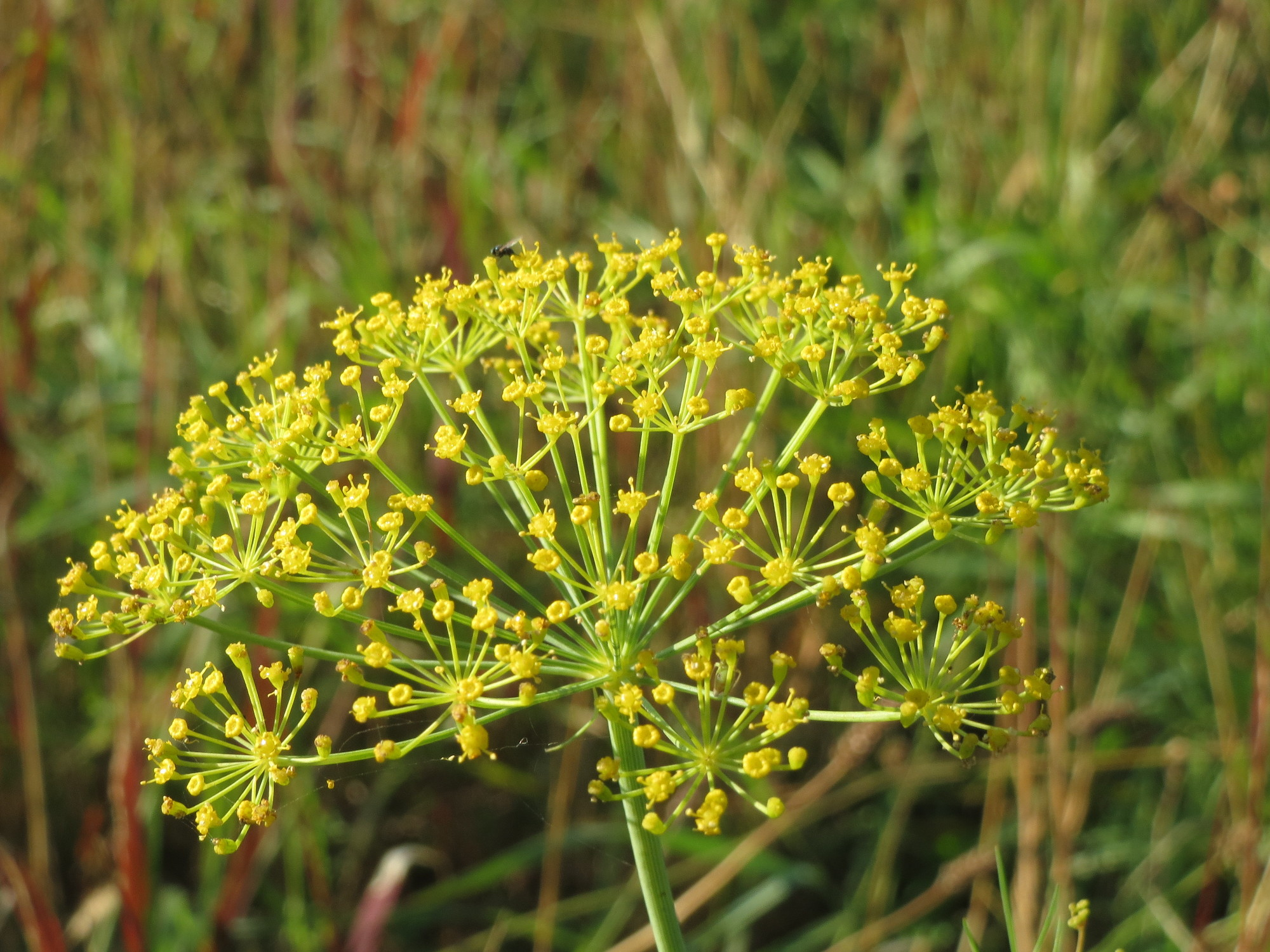
Yellow dill umbels

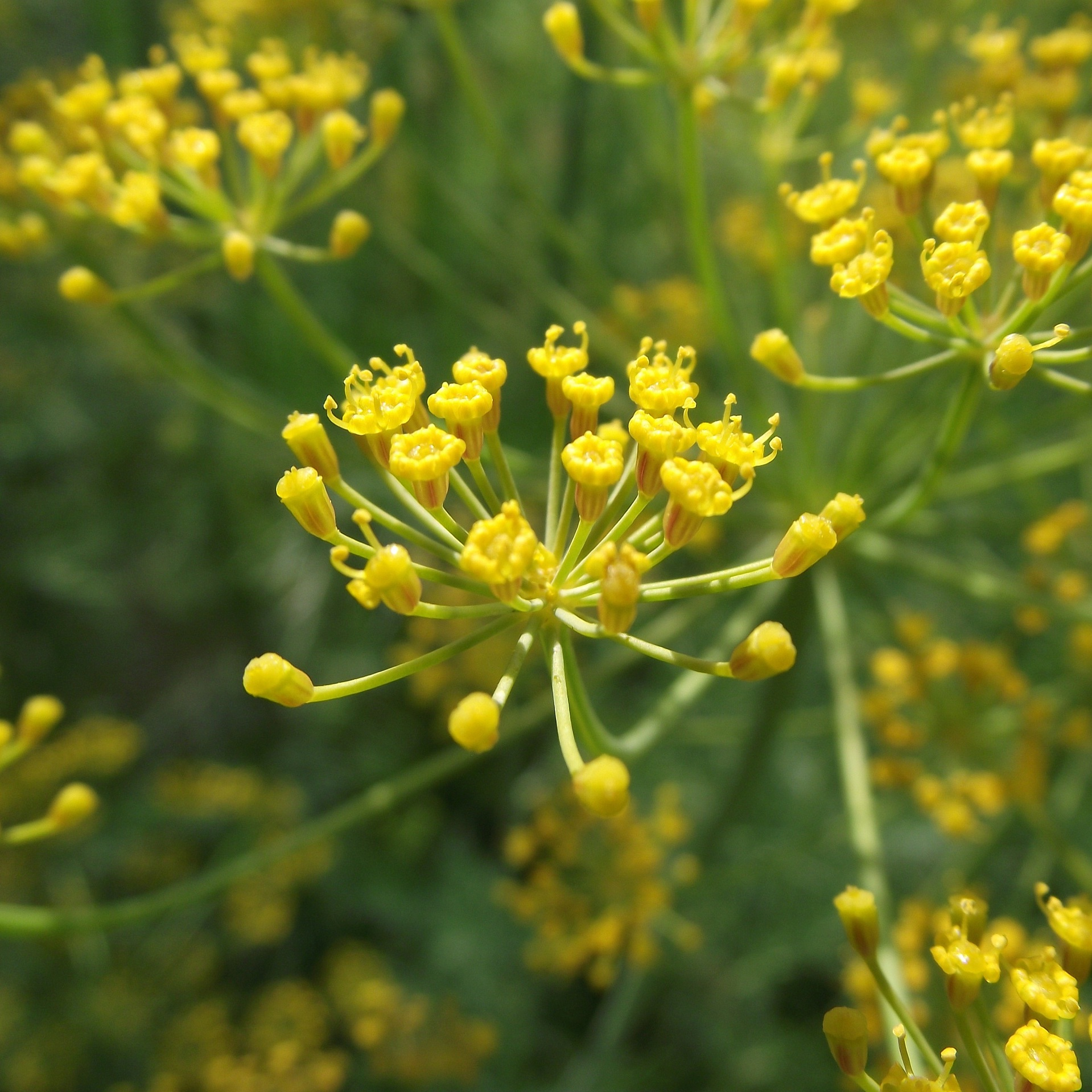
Closeup of an umbel

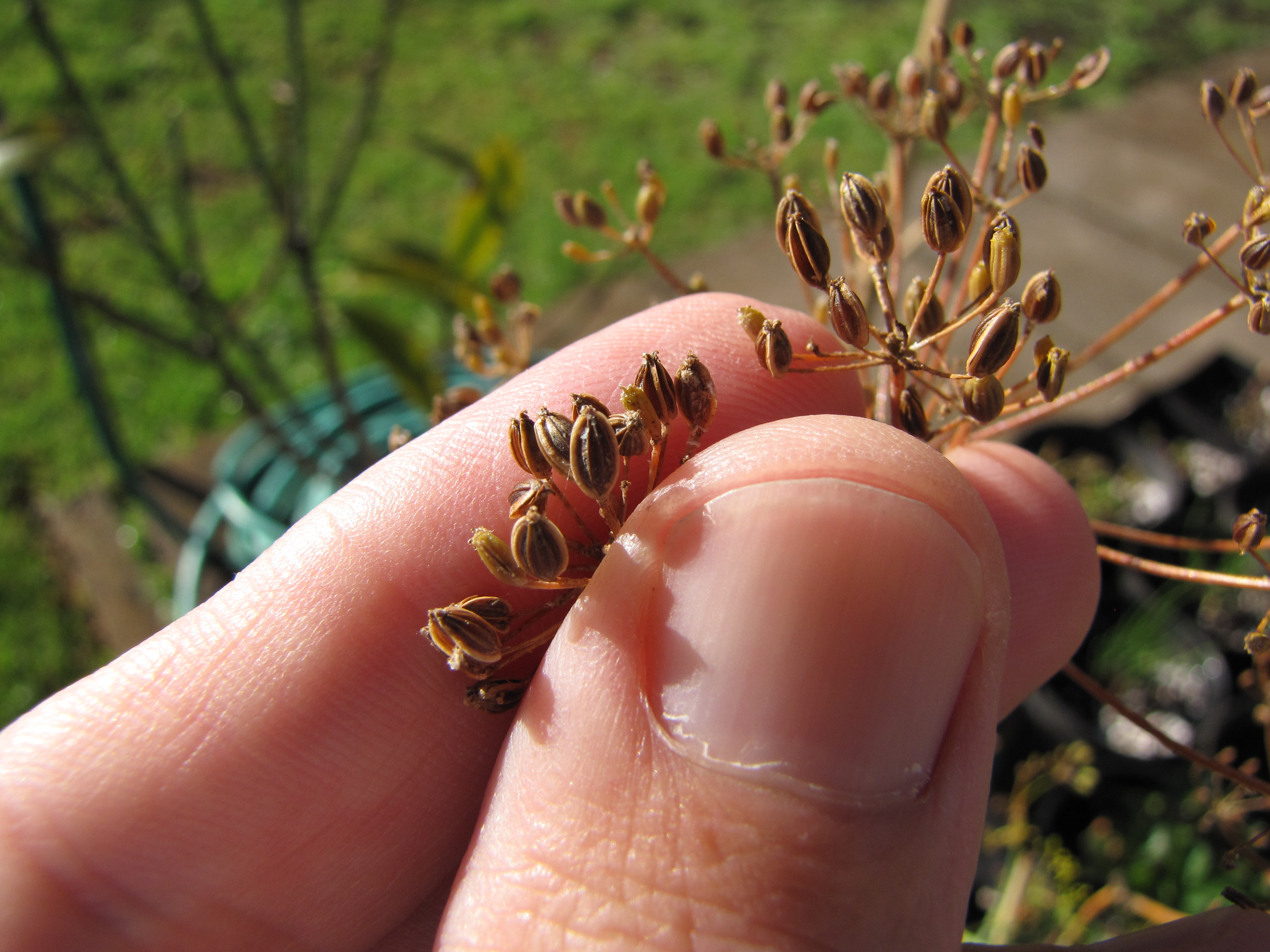
Dried dill fruit clusters

== Etymology ==
The genus name Anethum is the Latin form of Greek ἄνῑσον / ἄνησον / ἄνηθον / ἄνητον, which meant both "dill" and "anise". The form 'anīsum' came to be used for anise, and 'anēthum' for dill. The Latin word is the origin of dill's names in the Western Romance languages ('anet', 'aneldo' etc.), and also of the obsolete English 'anet'.

The word dill and its close relatives are found in most of the Germanic languages; its ultimate origin is unknown.

== Distribution and habitat ==
Dill is native to North Africa, Iran, and the Arabian Peninsula.

== Cultivation ==
Successful cultivation requires warm to hot summers with high sunshine levels; even partial shade will reduce the yield substantially. It also prefers rich, well-drained soil. The seed is harvested by cutting the flower heads off the stalks when the seed is beginning to ripen. The seed heads are placed upside down in a paper bag and left in a warm, dry place for a week. The seeds then separate from the stems easily for storage in an airtight container.

These plants, like their fennel and parsley relatives, often are eaten by black swallowtail caterpillars in areas where that species occurs. For this reason, they may be included in some butterfly gardens.

== Uses ==
=== Culinary ===
Dill weed, fresh
Nutritional value per 100 g (3.5 oz)
- Energy: 180 kJ (43 kcal)
- Carbohydrates: 7 g
- Dietary fiber: 2.1 g
- Fat: 1.1 g
- Protein: 3.5 g
Vitamins and minerals
Vitamins	Quantity %DV^{†}
Vitamin A equiv.	43% 386 μg
Thiamine (B1)	8% 0.1 mg
Riboflavin (B2)	23% 0.3 mg
Niacin (B3)	10% 1.6 mg
Pantothenic acid (B5)	8% 0.4 mg
Vitamin B6	12% 0.2 mg
Folate (B9)	38% 150 μg
Vitamin B12	0% 0 μg
Vitamin C	94% 85 mg
Minerals	Quantity %DV^{†}
Calcium	16% 208 mg
Iron	37% 6.6 mg
Magnesium	13% 55 mg
Manganese	57% 1.3 mg
Phosphorus	5% 66 mg
Potassium	25% 738 mg
Sodium	3% 61 mg
Zinc	8% 0.9 mg
- Other constituents: Quantity
- Copper 667: 0.14 mg (7%)
- Link to USDA Database entry
- ^{†}Percentages estimated using US recommendations for adults, except for potassium, which is estimated based on expert recommendation from the National Academies.

==== Aroma profile ====
- Apiole and dillapiole
- Carvone
- Limonene
- Myristicin
- Umbelliferone

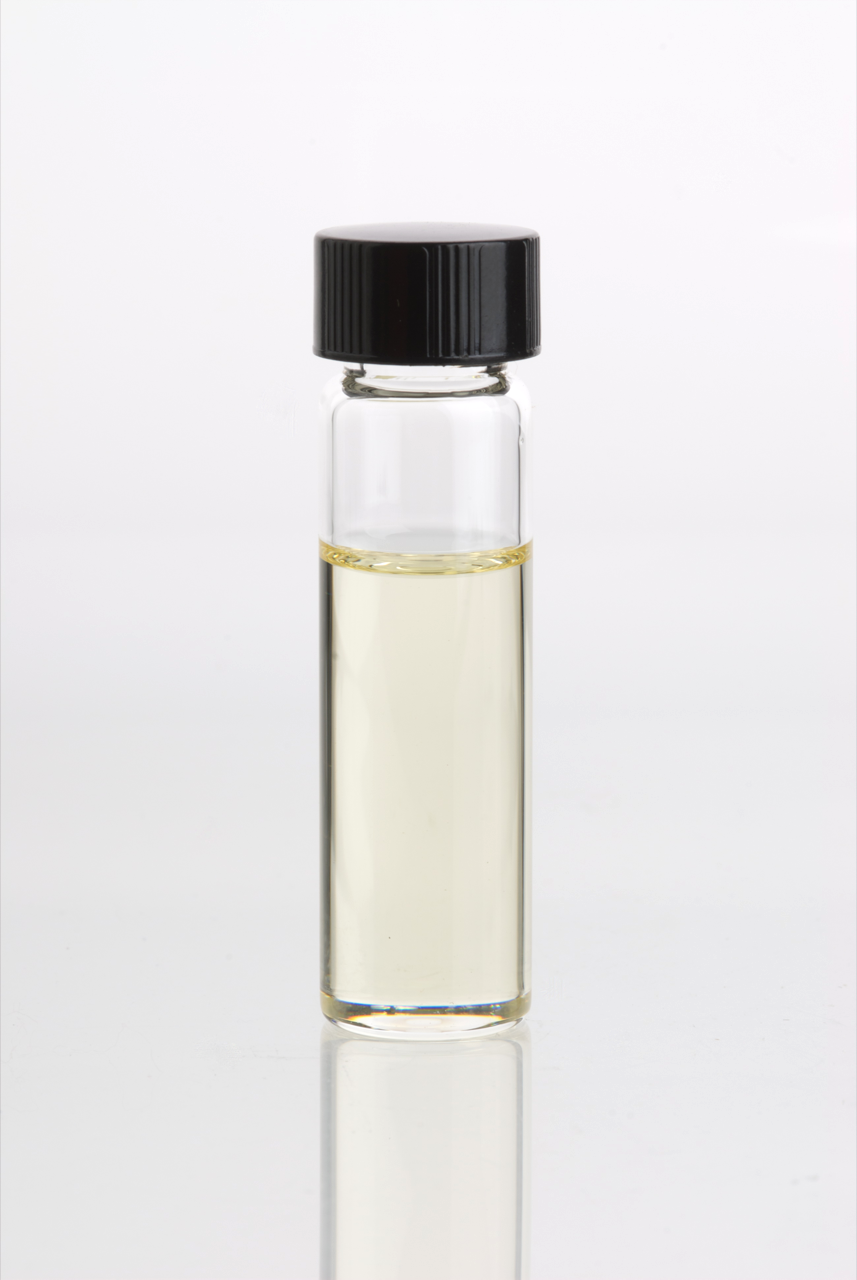
Dill essential oil in clear glass vial

Fresh and dried dill leaves (sometimes called "dill weed" or "dillweed" to distinguish it from dill seed) are widely used as herbs in Europe and in central and south-eastern Asia.

Like caraway, the fern-like leaves of dill are aromatic and are used to flavour many foods such as gravlax (cured salmon) and other fish dishes, borscht, and other soups, as well as pickles (where the dill flower is sometimes used). Dill is best when used fresh, as it loses its flavor rapidly if dried. However, freeze-dried dill leaves retain their flavour relatively well for a few months.

Dill oil is extracted from the leaves, stems, and seeds of the plant. The oil from the seeds is distilled and used in the manufacturing of soaps.

Dill is the eponymous ingredient in dill pickles.

==== Central and eastern Europe ====
In central and eastern Europe, the Nordic countries, the Baltic states, Ukraine, and Russia, dill is a staple culinary herb along with chives and parsley. Fresh, finely cut dill leaves are used as a topping in soups, especially the hot red borsht and the cold borsht mixed with curds, kefir, yogurt, or sour cream, which is served during hot summer weather and is called 'okroshka'. It also is popular in summer to drink fermented milk (curds, kefir, yogurt, or buttermilk) mixed with dill (and sometimes other herbs).

In the same way, dill is used as a topping for boiled potatoes covered with fresh butter – especially in summer when there are so-called new, or young, potatoes. The dill leaves may be mixed with butter, making a dill butter, to serve the same purpose. Dill leaves mixed with tvorog form one of the traditional cheese spreads used for sandwiches. Fresh dill leaves are used throughout the year as an ingredient in salads, e.g., one made of lettuce, fresh cucumbers, and tomatoes, as basil leaves are used in Italy and Greece.

Russian cuisine is noted for liberal use of dill, where it is known as укроп (ukrop). It is supposed to have antiflatulent properties; some Russian cosmonauts recommended its use in human spaceflight due to such properties being beneficial in confined quarters with a closed air supply.

In Polish cuisine, fresh dill leaves mixed with sour cream are the basis for dressings. It is especially popular to use this kind of sauce with freshly cut cucumbers, which are almost wholly immersed in the sauce, making a salad called 'mizeria'. Dill sauce is used hot for baked freshwater fish and for chicken or turkey breast, or used hot or cold for hard-boiled eggs. A dill-based soup, (zupa koperkowa), served with potatoes and hard-boiled eggs, is popular in Poland. Whole stems including roots and flower buds are used traditionally to prepare Polish-style pickled cucumbers (ogórki kiszone), especially the so-called low-salt cucumbers (ogórki małosolne). Whole stems of dill (often including the roots) also are cooked with potatoes, especially the potatoes of autumn and winter, so they resemble the flavour of the newer potatoes found in summer. Some kinds of fish, especially trout and salmon, traditionally are baked with the stems and leaves of dill.

In the Czech Republic, white dill sauce made of cream (or milk), butter, flour, vinegar, and dill is called 'koprová omáčka' (also 'koprovka' or 'kopračka') and is served either with boiled eggs and potatoes, or with dumplings and boiled beef. Another Czech dish with dill is a soup called 'kulajda' that contains mushrooms (traditionally wild ones).

In Germany, dill is popular as a seasoning for fish and many other dishes, chopped as a garnish on potatoes, and as a flavouring in pickles.

In the UK, dill may be used in fish pie.

In Bulgaria, dill is widely used in traditional vegetable salads, and most notably the yogurt-based cold soup Tarator. It is also used in the preparation of sour pickles, cabbage, and other dishes.

In Romania, dill (mărar) is widely used as an ingredient for soups such as 'borş' (pronounced "borsh"), pickles, and other dishes, especially those based on peas, beans, and cabbage. It is popular for dishes based on potatoes and mushrooms and may be found in many summer salads (especially cucumber salad, cabbage salad and lettuce salad). During springtime, it is used in omelets with spring onions. It often complements sauces based on sour cream or yogurt and is mixed with salted cheese and used as a filling. Another popular dish with dill as a main ingredient is dill sauce, which is served with eggs and fried sausages.

In Hungary, dill is very widely used. It is popular as a sauce or filling, and mixed with a type of cottage cheese. Dill is also used for pickling and in salads. The Hungarian name for dill is 'kapor'.

In Serbia, dill is known as 'mirodjija' and is used as an addition to soups, potato and cucumber salads, and French fries. It features in the Serbian proverb, "бити мирођија у свакој чорби" /biti mirodjija u svakoj čorbi/ (to be a dill in every soup), which corresponds to the English proverb "to have a finger in every pie".

In Greece, dill is known as άνηθος (anithos). In antiquity it was used as an ingredient in wines that were called "anithites oinos" (wine with anithos-dill). In modern days, dill is used in salads, soups, sauces, and fish and vegetable dishes.

In Santa Maria, Azores, dill (endro) is the most important ingredient of the traditional Holy Ghost soup (sopa do Espírito Santo). Dill is found ubiquitously in Santa Maria, yet, is rare in the other Azorean Islands.

In Sweden, dill is a common spice or herb. The flowers of fully grown dill are called 'krondill' (crown dill) and used when cooking crayfish. Krondill is also used to flavor pickles and vodka. The thinner part of dill and young plants may be used with boiled fresh potatoes. In salads it is used together with, or instead, of other green herbs, such as parsley, chives, and basil. It is often paired with chives. Dill is often used to flavour fish and seafood in Sweden, for example, gravlax and various herring pickles, among them the traditional 'sill i dill' (literally 'herring in dill'). There is also a traditional Swedish dish called 'dillkött', which is a meaty stew flavoured with dill, commonly served as a vinegary sauce. Dill seeds may be used in breads or 'akvavit'. A newer use of dill is to pair it with chives as a flavouring for potato chips. These are called 'dillchips'.

In Finland, the uses of dill are very similar to those in Sweden, including flavouring potato chips and, less popularly, in a dish similar to 'dillkött' ('tilliliha'). However, the use of dill in Finland is not as extensive as in large parts of central and eastern Europe, particularly Russia but including even the ethnolinguistically close Estonia.

==== Asia and Middle East ====
Nation/region	Language	Local name of dill	Dishes commonly used in
Arab world	Arabic	شبت، شبث (shabat, shabath)	As flavouring in various dishes
Bangladesh	Bangla	শলুক, শুলফা (Śaluka, śulaphā)	মসলা
China	Mandarin	shíluó (蒔蘿 (traditional) / 莳萝 (simplified)) or colloquially tuhuíxiāng (土茴香)	baozi, jiaozi, xianbing
China	Cantonese	si4 lo4 (蒔蘿), but colloquially and more commonly diu1 cou2 (刁草)	
India	Bengali	Sholpa (শোল্পা), Mouri (মৌরি)	পাঁচ ফোড়ন
India	Gujarati	Suva	Suvaa ni Bhaji (with potato)
India	Hindi	Soa / Soya (सोआ)	Soa Sabzi (with potato). As a flavour in: Green Kheema, Kheema samosa
India	Kannada	sabbasige soppu (ಸಬ್ಬಸಿಗೆ ಸೊಪ್ಪು)	Sambhar
India	Konkani	sheppi bhaji (ಶೇಪ್ಪಿ ಭಾಜಿ) (शेप्पी भाजी)	
India	Malayalam	Chatakuppa (ചതകുപ്പ)	
India	Marathi	Shepu (शेपू)	Shepuchi Bhaji, Shepu Pulao, Ashe Mast
India	Tamil	Sadakuppi (சதகுப்பி)	Curry
India	Telugu	Soa-Kura (శత పుష్పం)	
India	Punjabi	Pahadi Saunf / Kaudi Saunf	
Israel/Jewish Diaspora	Hebrew	שֶבֶת (shevet, sheves, sheveth) שָׁמִיר (shamir)	
Iran	Persian	Shevid	'Aash', 'Baghali Polo', 'Shevid Polo', 'Mast O Khiar'
T‌hailand	T‌hai	phak chee Lao (ผักชีลาว)	Gaeng om (แกงอ่อม)
Vietnam	Vietnamese	T‌hì là	Many fish dishes in northern Vietnam

In Iran, dill is known as 'shevid' and sometimes, is used with rice and called 'shevid-polo'. It also is used in Iranian 'aash' recipes, and similarly, is called sheved in Persian.

In India, dill is known as 'Sholpa' in Bengali, shepu (शेपू) in Marathi, sheppi (शेप्पी) in Konkani, savaa in Hindi, or soa in Punjabi. In Telugu, it is called 'Soa-kura' (herb greens). It also is called sabbasige soppu (ಸಬ್ಬಸಿಗೆ ಸೊಪ್ಪು) in Kannada. In Tamil it is known as sada kuppi (சதகுப்பி). In Malayalam, it is ചതകുപ്പ (chathakuppa) or ശതകുപ്പ (sathakuppa). In Sanskrit, this herb is called shatapushpa. In Gujarati, it is known as suva (સૂવા). In India, dill is prepared in the manner of yellow 'moong dal', as a main-course dish. It is considered to have very good antiflatulent properties, so it is used as 'mukhwas', or an after-meal digestive. Traditionally, it is given to mothers immediately after childbirth. In the state of Uttar Pradesh in India, a small amount of fresh dill is cooked along with cut potatoes and fresh fenugreek leaves (Hindi आलू-मेथी-सोया).

In Manipur, dill, locally known as pakhon, is an essential ingredient of chagem pomba – a traditional Manipuri dish made with fermented soybean and rice.

In Laos and parts of northern T‌hailand, dill is known in English as Lao coriander (Lao: ຜັກຊີ or Thai: ผักชีลาว), and served as a side with salad yum or papaya salad. In the Lao language, it is called 'phak see', and in T‌hai, it is known as 'phak chee Lao'. In Lao cuisine, Lao coriander is used extensively in traditional Lao dishes such as 'mok pa' (steamed fish in banana leaf) and several coconut milk curries that contain fish or prawns.

In China dill is called colloquially, 'huíxiāng' (茴香, perfume of Hui people), or more properly 'shíluó' (莳萝/蒔蘿). It is a common filling in 'baozi', 'jiaozi' and 'xianbing' and may be used as vegetarian with rice vermicelli, or combined with either meat or eggs. Vegetarian dill baozi are a common part of a Beijing breakfast. In baozi and xianbing, it often is interchangeable with non-bulbing fennel and the term 茴香 also may refer to fennel, similarly to caraway and coriander leaf, sharing a name in Chinese as well. Dill also may be stir fried as a potherb, often with egg, in the same manner as Chinese chives. In Northern China, Beijing, Inner-Mongolia, Ningxia, Gansu, and Xinjiang, dill seeds commonly are called 'zīrán' (孜然), but also 'kūmíng' (枯茗), 'kūmíngzi' (枯茗子), 'shíluózi' (莳萝子/蒔蘿子), 'xiǎohuíxiāngzi' (小茴香子) and are used with pepper for lamb meat. In the whole of China, 'yángchuàn' (羊串) or 'yángròu chuàn' (羊肉串), lamb brochette, a speciality from Uyghurs, uses cumin and pepper.

In Cantonese-speaking regions such as Hong Kong and Macau, the leaves are more colloquially known as 刁草 (diu1 cou2), a partial calque of the English 'dillweed'; 'dill' transliterated into the otherwise unrelated 刁 diu1 and 'weed' translated as 草 cou2.

In Taiwan, it is also commonly used as a filling in steamed buns (baozi) and dumplings (jiaozi).

In Vietnam, the use of dill in cooking is regional. It is used mainly in northern Vietnamese cuisine.

==== Middle East ====
In Arab countries, dill seed, called ain jaradeh (grasshopper's eye), is used as a spice in cold dishes such as fattoush, and pickles. In Arab countries of the Persian Gulf, dill is called 'shibint' and is used mostly in fish dishes. In Egypt, dillweed is commonly used to flavour cabbage dishes, including mahshi koronb (stuffed cabbage leaves).

=== Companion planting ===
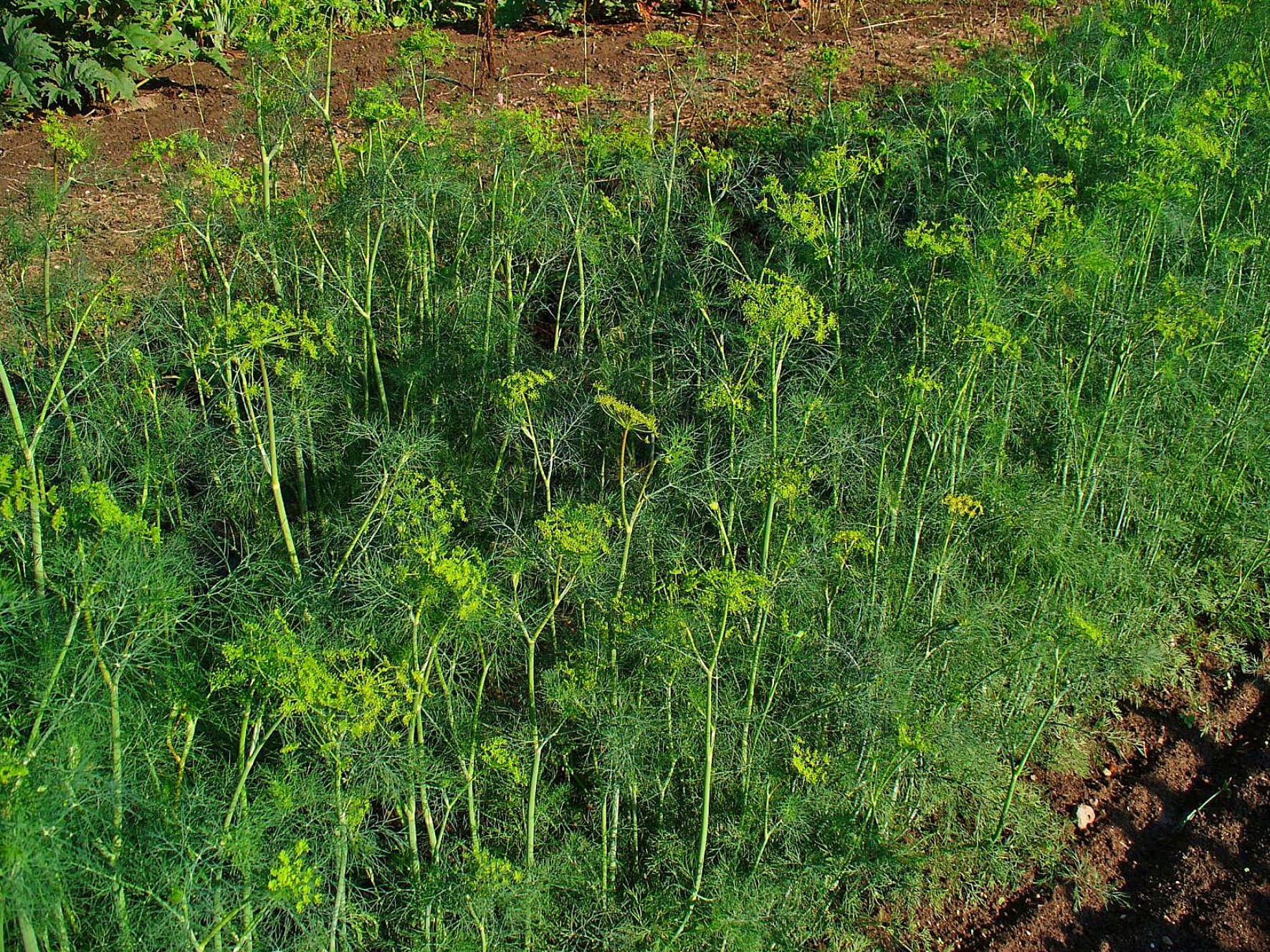
Dill plants

When used as a companion plant, dill attracts many beneficial insects as the umbrella flower heads go to seed, including the predators of pests. It makes a good companion plant for cucumbers and broccoli.

Tomato plants benefit from dill when it is young because it repels harmful pests while attracting pollinators. However, the dill must be pruned before it flowers, otherwise it can slow or stop the growth of the tomatoes.

== In culture ==
Dill has been found in the tomb of Egyptian Pharaoh Amenhotep II, dating to around 1400 BC. It was also later found in the Greek city of Samos, around the 7th century BC, and mentioned in the writings of Theophrastus (371–287 BC). In Greek mythology, the dill was originally a young man named Anethus who was transformed into the plant.

== See also ==
- List of Indian spices
