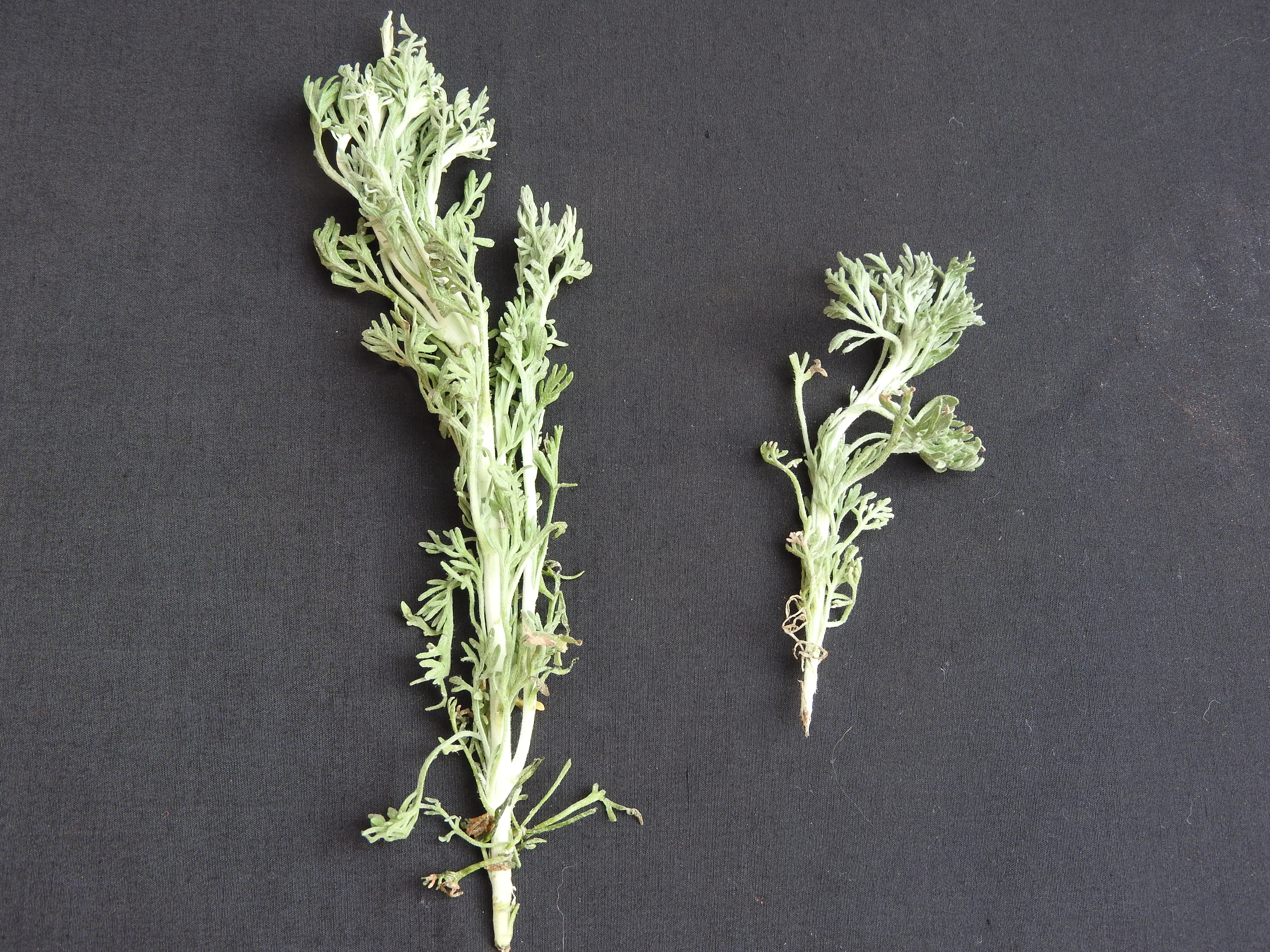

Scientific classification
- Kingdom: Plantae
- Clade: Tracheophytes
- Clade: Angiosperms
- Clade: Eudicots
- Clade: Asterids
- Order: Asterales
- Family: Asteraceae
- Genus: Artemisia
- Species: A. pallens

Binomial name
- Artemisia pallens Wall. ex DC.

= Artemisia pallens =

Species of flowering plant

Artemisia pallens is an aromatic herb, in genus of small herbs or shrubs, xerophytic in nature. Commonly known as dhavanam from the Sanskrit name दमनक (damanaka), (Tamil: மரிக்கொழுந்து, தவணம், Marathi: दवणा, Kannada: ದವನ). The flowers are racemose panicles, bear numerous small yellow flower heads or capitula, but the silvery white silky covering of down gives the foliage a grey or white appearance.

Dhavanam has alternate pinnasect leaves (leaf which is divided into opposite pairs of lobes cut almost to the midrib in narrow divisions) or palmatisect leaves (the green tissue is divided into several segments not fully separated at the base).

== Cultivation ==
It is commercially cultivated for its fragrant leaves and flowers. It has two distinct morphological types, one in which the plants are short in stature and flowering sets in early, and the other in which plants are tall and flowering sets in later. It grows from seeds and cuttings and reaches maturity in four months. The plant is woody in the lower part of the stem, but with yearly branches. It is mostly grown in the Indian states of Andhra Pradesh, Karnataka, Maharashtra and Tamil Nadu.

Artemisia pallens is a preferred food for the larvae of a number of butterfly species.

== Chemistry ==
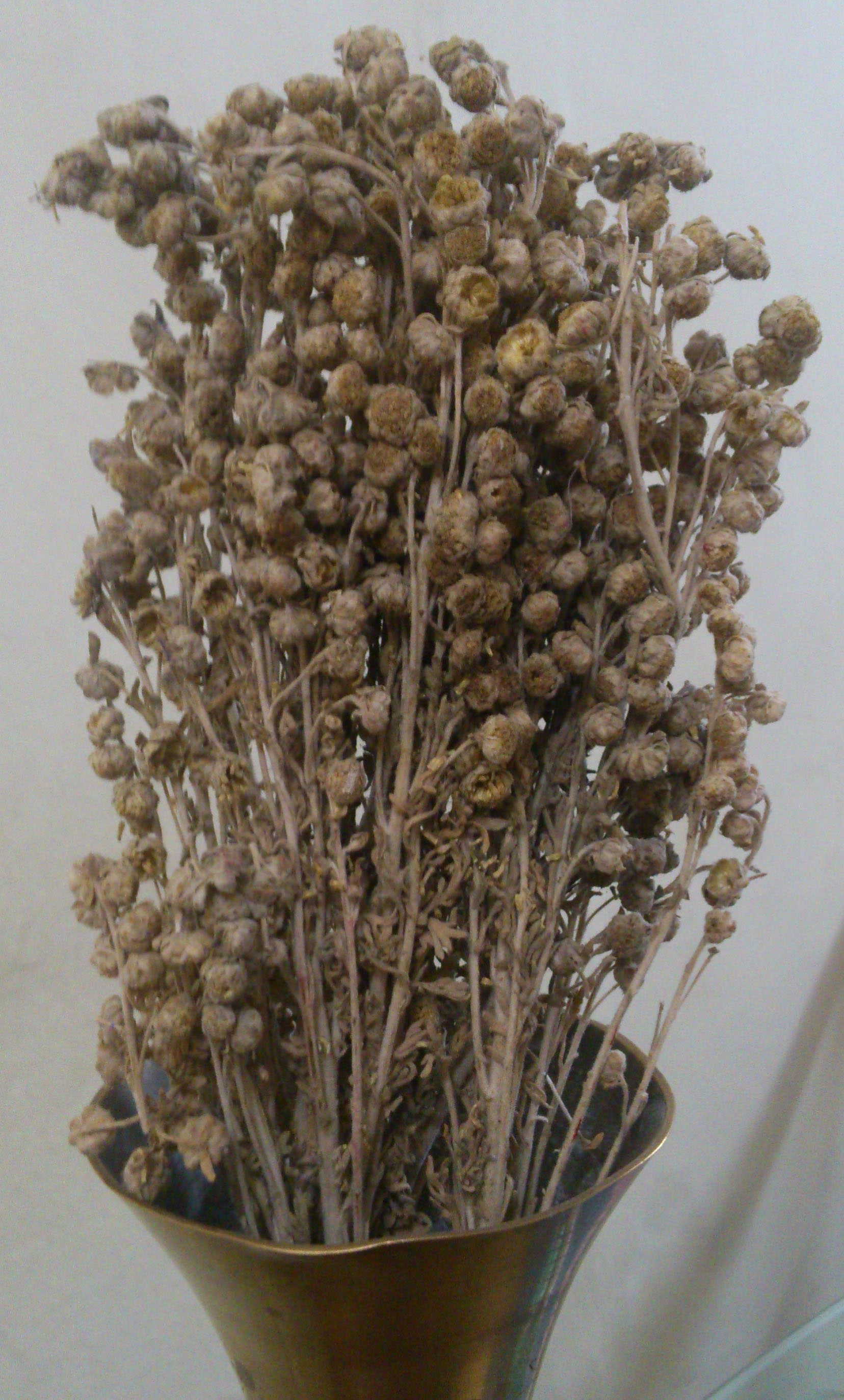
Dried davana plant used as aromatic bouquet.

Davanone, davan ether, davana furan and linalool are the major constituents of davana oil. Methyl cinnamate, ethyl cinnamate, bicyclogermacrene, 2-hydroxyisodavanone, farnesol, geranyl acetate, sesquiterpene lactones, and germacranolides are also found. The amount of davanone and linalool decreased while those of (Z)− and (E)−methyl cinnamate, (E)−ethyl cinnamate, bicyclogermacrene, davana ether, 2-hydroxyisodavanone, and farnesol increased from flower heads emergence stage to the initiation of seed set stage. Five compounds, (Z)− and (E)−methyl cinnamates, (Z)− and (E)−ethyl cinnamates, and geranyl acetate, were identified for the first time in davana oil.

== Uses ==
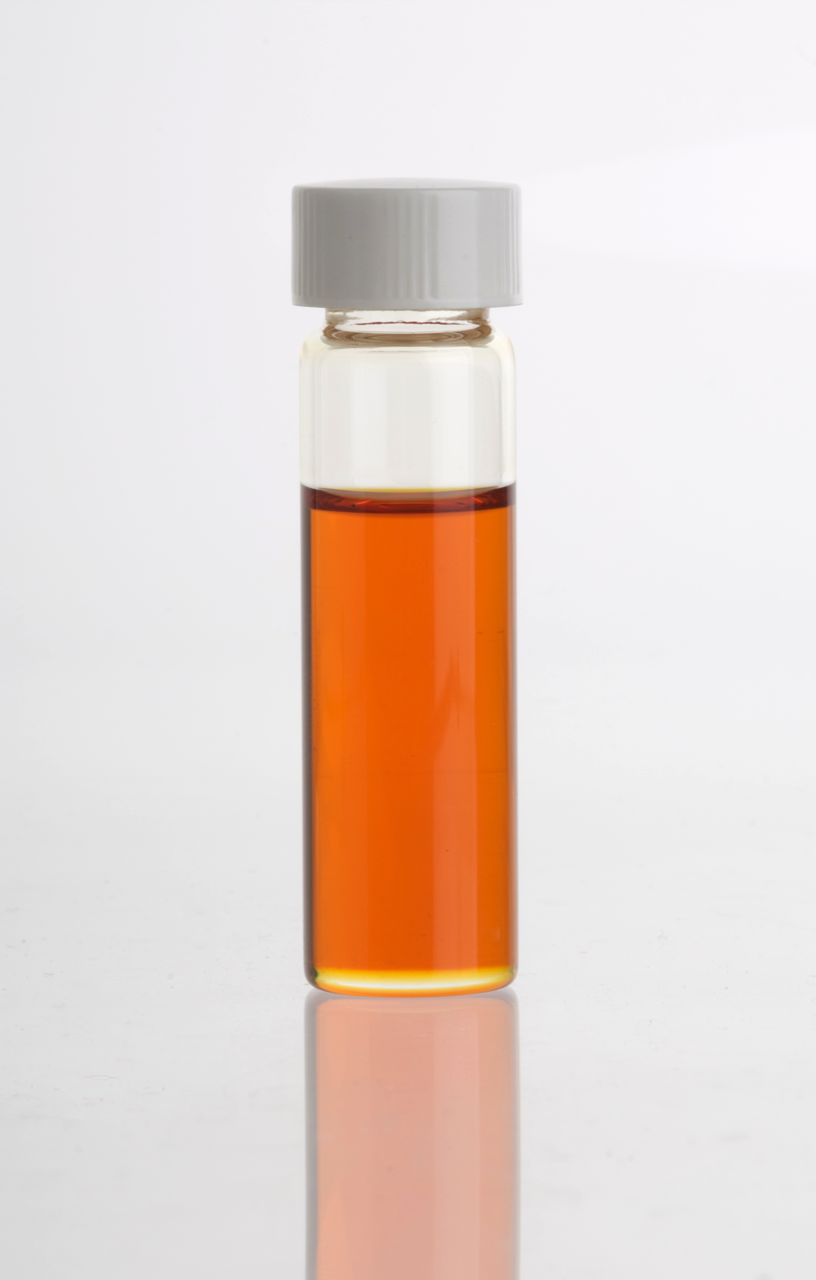
Davana essential oil

The leaves and flowers yield an essential oil known as oil of Davana. Several species yield essential oil and some are used as fodder, some of them are a source of the anthelmintic chemical santonin. Davana blossoms are offered to Shiva, the God of Transformation, by the devotees, and decorate his altar throughout the day. Oral administration of high doses aqueous/methanolic extract from the aerial parts of the plants was observed to reduce blood glucose levels in glucose−fed hyperglycemic and alloxan-treated rabbits and rats. Davana is rarely used in cooking, but in India it is sometimes used in herbal teas for flavor.

The aroma of davana oil is described as fruity, berry, black currant, tropical fruit, dried fruit, apricot, and tagette.

=== Uses of Davana oil ===
- Davana oil is used in making perfumes of sweet and fruity fragrances.
- Davana leaves and stalks are used in making bouquets, garlands, fresh or dry flower arrangements.

== Hinduism ==
Dauna leaves are found abundantly on the Wadi Ratnagiri Mountain, in the city of Kolhapur. The mountain is home to Shri Jotiba. The plant is exclusively used as an offering to this deity at this temple.

Dhavana is also used in the Rathothsavam of sri khadri Narasimha swami temple, kadiri. There people throw dhavanam on the Ratham, while moving through the maadaveedhulu.
