= Transition metal sulfoxide complex =

Class of coordination compounds containing sulfoxide ligands

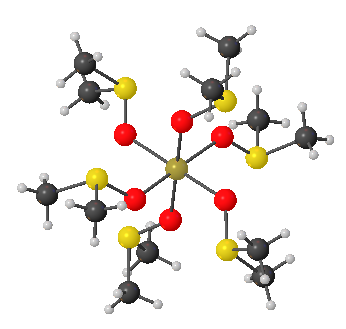
Structure of the [Fe(dmso)_{6}]^{3+}.

A transition metal sulfoxide complex is a coordination complex containing one or more sulfoxide ligands. The inventory is large.

== Scope of sulfoxide ligands ==
The most common sulfoxide ligand is dimethyl sulfoxide (dmso). Many sulfoxides are known because an enormous range of organic substituents are possible. When the two substituents differ, the ligand is chiral. Chiral sulfoxides are configurationally stable. One example is methyl phenyl sulfoxide.

== Structures ==
cis-dichlorotetrakis(dimethylsulfoxide)ruthenium(II)	trans-dichlorotetrakis(dimethylsulfoxide)ruthenium(II)

Sulfoxides can bind to metals by the oxygen atom or by sulfur. This dichotomy is called linkage isomerism. O-bonded sulfoxide ligands are far more common, especially for 1st row metals. S-bonded sulfoxides are only found for soft metal centers, such as Ru(II). Complexes with both O- and S-bonded sulfoxide ligands are known. In some cases, sulfoxides are bridging ligands, with S bonded to one metal and O bonded to the other.

== Synthesis and reactions ==
Being a polar solvent with a high dielectric constants, dmso dissolves many metal salts to give the corresponding complexes. Other ligand-solvent combinations include acetonitrile and water, which respectively form metal-acetonitrile complexes and metal aquo complexes. Treatment of thioether complexes with peroxide reagents gives sulfoxide complexes. In rare cases, sulfoxide complexes are prepared by S-alkylation of sulfenito complexes.

Metal thioether complexes are susceptible to sulfoxidation with dimethyldioxirane.

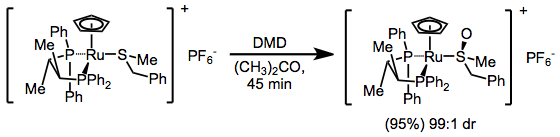

== Reactions ==
Being weakly basic, sulfoxide ligands are generally labile, i.e. they are rapidly displaced by other more basic ligands.

O-bonded sulfoxide ligands are susceptible to oxidation at sulfur. In this way, the weakly bonded ligand is converted into a leaving group, such as dimethylsulfone. Since dmso is susceptible to deprotonation by strong base, cationic dmso complexes might be expected to undergo H-D exchange under basic conditions. Such behavior is not observed even for the trication [Co(NH_{3})_{5}(dmso)]^{3+}.

Several metal sulfoxide complexes have been investigated as catalysts. The molybdoenzyme DMSO reductase catalyzes the reduction of dmso to dimethyl sulfide.

== Examples ==
Several homoleptic octahedral complexes of sulfoxides have been characterized by X-ray crystallography. These include the [M(dmso)_{6}]^{2+} complexes for M = Cr(III), Mn(II), Fe(II), Fe(III), Co(II), Co(III), Ni(II), Cu(II), Zn(II), Cd(II), and Hg(II). All such derivatives feature O-bonded sulfoxides. The tricationic complex in [Rh(dmso)_{6}](O_{3}SCF_{3})_{3} features one S-bonded and five O-bonded sulfoxide ligands. The complex [Cu(Ph_{2}SO)_{4}]^{2+} is square planar, in contrast to the derivative with dmso ligands. The square planar d^{8} complex [Rh(dmso)_{4}]^{+} features a pairs of S- and O-bonded sulfoxide ligands.
