= Thioether S-methyltransferase =

Identifiers
- EC no.: 2.1.1.96
- CAS no.: 114797-02-3

Databases
- IntEnz: IntEnz view
- BRENDA: BRENDA entry
- ExPASy: NiceZyme view
- KEGG: KEGG entry
- MetaCyc: metabolic pathway
- PRIAM: profile
- PDB structures: RCSB PDB PDBe PDBsum
- Gene Ontology: AmiGO / QuickGO
Search
- PMC: articles
- PubMed: articles
- NCBI: proteins

Thioether S-methyltransferase (EC 2.1.1.96) is an enzyme that catalyzes the chemical reaction.

dimethyl sulfide
+ SAM
trimethylsulfonium
+ SAH

This is a methylation reaction in which dimethyl sulfide is converted to timethylsulfonium cation. The methyl group comes from the cofactor, S-adenosyl methionine (SAM), which becomes S-adenosyl-L-homocysteine (SAH).

This enzyme belongs to the family of transferases, specifically those transferring one-carbon group methyltransferases. The systematic name of this enzyme class is S-adenosyl-L-methionine:dimethyl-sulfide S-methyltransferase. Other names in common use include S-adenosyl-L-methionine:thioether S-methyltransferase, and thioether methyltransferase. It can act on many other thioethers.
