= C7H8S =

The molecular formula C_{7}H_{8}S (molar mass: 124.20 g/mol, exact mass: 124.0347 u) may refer to:

- Thioanisole
- Benzyl mercaptan (phenylmethanethiol)
