= C6H12S2 =

The molecular formula C_{6}H_{12}S_{2} (molar mass: 148.28 g/mol, exact mass: 148.0380 u) may refer to:

- Allyl propyl disulfide
- 1,5-Dithiacyclooctane (DTCO)
