= Trimethylsulfoxonium =

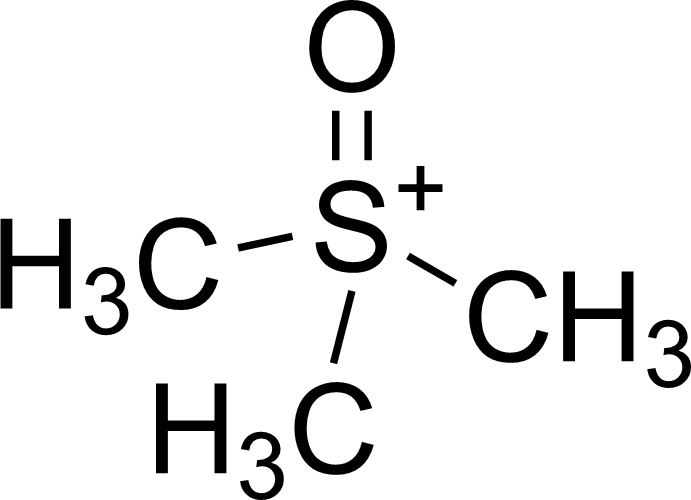

Names
- IUPAC name Trimethyl(oxo)-λ^{4}-sulfanium

Identifiers
CAS Number	47987-92-8
3D model (JSmol)	Interactive image
ChEMBL	ChEMBL1183173
ChemSpider	67080
PubChem CID	74499
CompTox Dashboard (EPA)	DTXSID30275729
- InChI: InChI=1S/C3H9OS/c1-5(2,3)4/h1-3H3/q+1 Key: YRYSAWZMIRQUBO-UHFFFAOYSA-N
- SMILES: C[S+](=O)(C)C

Properties
Chemical formula	C_{3}H_{9}OS^{+}
Molar mass	93.16 g·mol^{−1}

Related compounds
Related compounds	trimethylsulfonium; trimethylselenoxonium
- Except where otherwise noted, data are given for materials in their standard state (at 25 °C [77 °F], 100 kPa). Infobox references

Trimethylsulfoxonium (abbreviated TMSO) is a cation with a formula (CH_{3})_{3}SO^{+} consisting of a sulfur atom attached to three methyl groups and one oxygen atom. It has a net charge of +1.

== Production ==
Refluxing dimethyl sulfoxide with methyl iodide can yield trimethylsulfoxonium iodide.

== Reactions ==
Treated with sodium hydride, trimethylsulfoxonium forms dimethylsulfoxonium methylide.

Trimethylsulfoxonium can polymerise to yield polyethylene.

Copper, zinc and palladium ions in water react with trimethylsulfoxonium and sodium hydroxide to form sulfur ylide complexes.

== Properties ==
In the chloride, the sulfur-oxygen bond length is 1.436 Å, sulfur-carbon bond is 1.742. OSC angles are 112.6°, and CSC angles are 106.2°.

== List of compounds ==
name	formula	crystal Å	volume	density	comment	reference
trimethylsulfoxonium phthalimide	[C_{3}H_{9}SO][C_{8}H_{4}NO_{2}]	orthorhombic Pnma a=8.445 b=10.958 c=12.084 Z=4	1118.2		colourless	
Trimethylsulfoxonium nitrate						
Trimethylsulfoxonium tetraphenylborate	[(CH_{3})_{3}SO]Ph_{4}B	P2_{1}/m a=9.482 b=12.790 c=9.713 β=106.48° Z=2	1130	1.177		
Trimethylsulfoxonium chloride	[(CH_{3})_{3}SO]Cl				white; sublime 227°C	
Trimethylsulfoxonium chromate						
trimethylsulfoxonium tetrachloridocobaltate(II)	[(CH_{3})_{3}SO]_{2}CoCl_{4}	monoclinic, P2_{1}/c a = 8.4397, b = 15.6692, c = 12.5989, β = 93.858°, Z = 4	1662.3		blue	
Trimethylsulfoxonium bromide						
Trimethylsulfoxonium iodide	[(CH_{3})_{3}SO]I				yellow; dec 170°C	
	[(CH_{3})_{3}SO]Cu_{2}I_{3}	Pnma				
	[(CH_{3})_{3}SO]Ag_{2}I_{3}	Pnma				
trimethyloxosulfonium trichloro-cadmate	[(CH_{3})_{3}SO]CdCl_{3}	orthorhombic Pnma a=6.688 b=10.147 c=13.446 Z=4	912.5	2.270		
trimethyloxosulfonium tribromo-cadmate	[(CH_{3})_{3}SO]CdBr_{3}	orthorhombic Pnma a=6.946 b=10.543 c=13.782 Z=4	1009.3	2.928	colourless	
bis(trimethylsulfoxonium) catena-poly[μ_{2}-hexabromido-indium(III)sodium(I)]	[(CH_{3})_{3}SO]_{2}NaInBr_{6}	orthorhombic, Pmn2_{1}, a = 10.5451, b = 7.1169, c = 13.7034, Z = 2	1028.42		colourless	
	[(CH_{3})_{3}SO]PbBr_{3}	orthorhombic Pnma a=7.5697 b=10.7768 c=13.9143 Z=4	1135.09	3.160	white	
	[(CH_{3})_{3}SO]PbI_{3}	orthorhombic Pnma a=7.8157 b=11.1996 c=14.3780 Z=4	1260.29	3.590	light yellow; band gap 2.30 eV	
	[(CH_{3})_{3}SO]_{3}Bi_{2}Br_{9}	orthorhombic Pnma a=7.0351 b=10.6613 c=13.9190	1043.98	3.004	light yellow	
	[(CH_{3})_{3}SO]_{3}Bi_{2}I_{9}	orthorhombic Pnma a=7.4530 b=11.2169 c=14.4009	1203.92	3.383	red	
