= Pentaamminenitritocobalt(III) chloride =

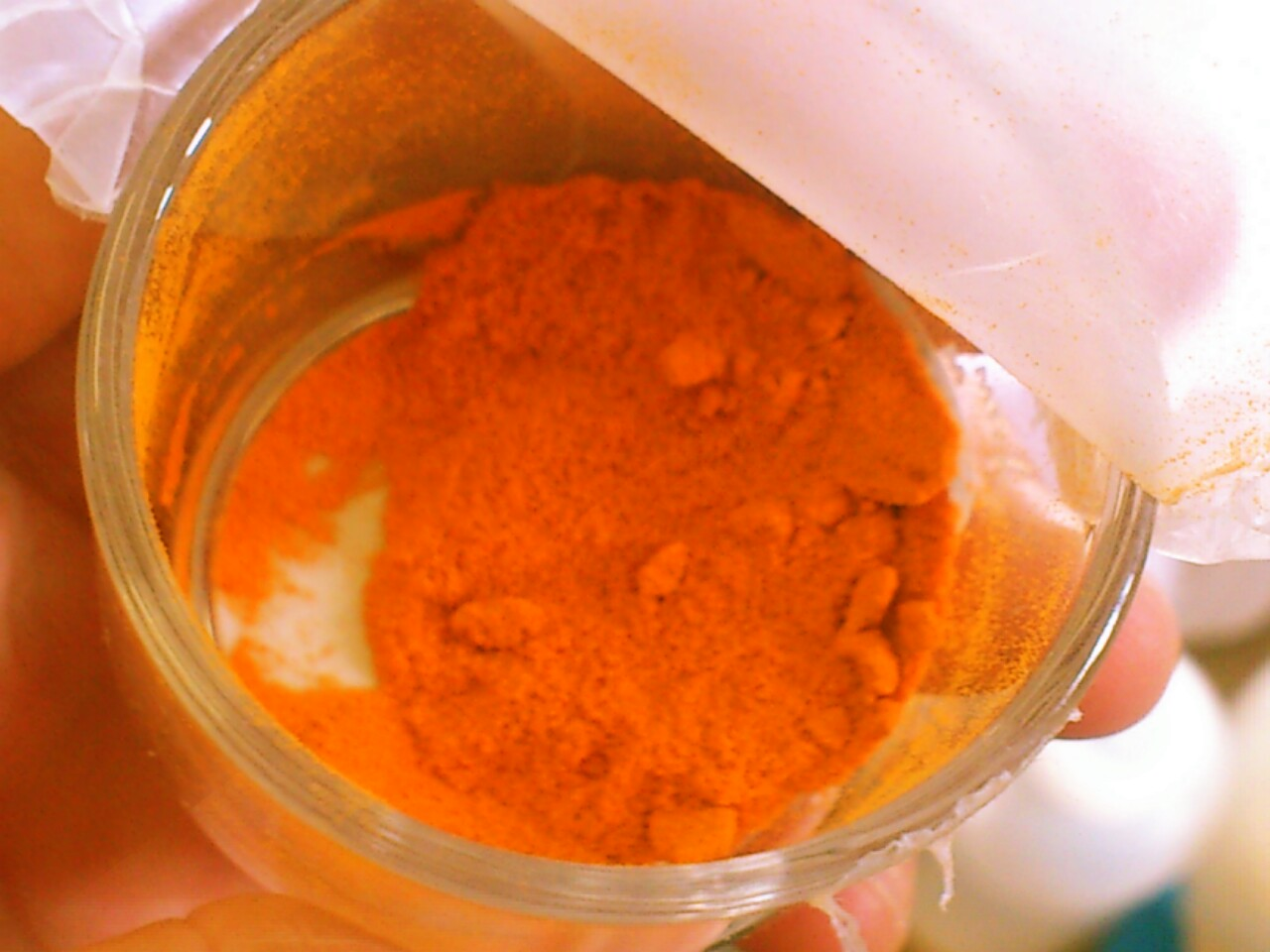

Identifiers
| CAS Number | 13782-02-0 |
| 3D model (JSmol) | Interactive image |
- InChI: InChI=1S/2ClH.Co.NO2.5H3N/c;;;2-1-3;;;;;/h2*1H;;;5*1H3/q;;+2;;;;;;/p-2 Key: XDIZJFSXOMJOOS-UHFFFAOYSA-L
- SMILES: [Cl-].[Cl-].O=N(=O)[Co+2]([NH3])([NH3])([NH3])([NH3])[NH3]

Properties
| Chemical formula | H_{15}N_{6}O_{2}Cl_{2}Co |
| Molar mass | 261.00 g/mol |
| Density | 1.83 g/mL |
- Except where otherwise noted, data are given for materials in their standard state (at 25 °C [77 °F], 100 kPa). Infobox references

Pentaamminenitritocobalt(III) chloride is an inorganic compound with the molecular formula [Co(NH_{3})_{5}(NO_{2})]Cl_{2}. It is an orange solid that is soluble in water. The compound has been of academic interest as a source of the transition metal nitrite complex [Co(NH_{3})_{5}(NO_{2})]^{2+}.

== Linkage isomers ==
The coordination complexes [Co(NH_{3})_{5}(NO_{2})]^{2+} and [Co(NH_{3})_{5}(ONO)]^{2+} were the first observed case of linkage isomerism. This nitritopentaamminecobalt(III) isomer converts to the more stable nitro form at room temperature. The two isomers can be distinguished by UV-Vis spectroscopy. Absorbance maxima for the nitro isomer occur at 457.5, 325, and 239 nm. The nitrito has maxima at 486, 330, and 220 nm. Their IR spectra also differ. The nitrito isomer absorbs at 1460 and 1065 cm^{−1}. The nitro isomer absorbs at 1430 and 825 cm^{−1}. The O-linkage isomer scrambles rapidly between the two oxygen sites, i.e. Co-O*NO/Co-ONO*.

In the related chloronitrate salt, the linkage isomerism causes thermosalience.

== Preparation and reactions ==
Nitritopentaamminecobalt(III) chloride is prepared by treating chloropentamminecobalt chloride with sodium nitrite:

[Co(NH_{3})_{5}Cl]^{2+} + NO_{2}^{−} → [Co(NH_{3})_{5}(ONO)]^{2+} + Cl^{−}

Heating a solution of the nitrito complex gives the nitro isomer.

Nitropentaamminecobalt(III) chloride has been studied for its ability to repress cell division. This property has been tested to inhibit the growth of tumors and bacteria such as E. coli. However, it has been found that several other compounds are superior inhibitors.
