= Transition metal nitrite complex =

Chemical complexes containing one or more –NO2 ligands

Sodium cobaltinitrite is a salt of the coordination complex [Co(NO_{2})_{6}]^{3−}.

In organometallic chemistry, transition metal complexes of nitrite describes families of coordination complexes containing one or more nitrite (−NO_{2}) ligands. Although the synthetic derivatives are only of scholarly interest, metal-nitrite complexes occur in several enzymes that participate in the nitrogen cycle.

== Structure and bonding ==
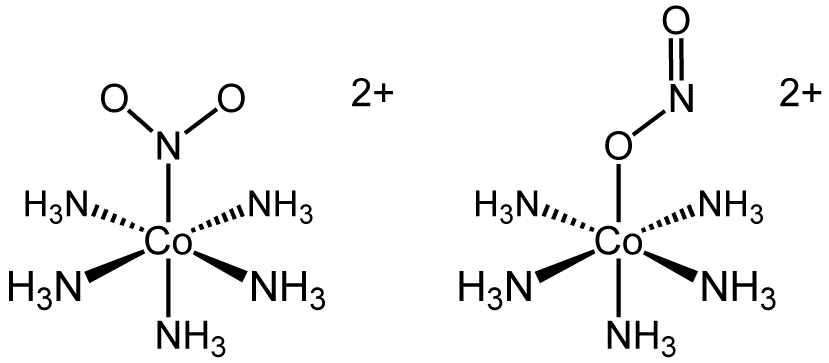
Structures of the two linkage isomers of [Co(NH_{3})_{5}(NO_{2})]^{2+}

=== Bonding modes ===
Three linkage isomers are common for nitrite ligands, O-bonded, N-bonded, and bidentate O,O-bonded. The former two isomers have been characterized for the pentamminecobalt(III) system, i.e. [(NH_{3})_{5}Co−NO_{2}]^{2+} and [(NH_{3})_{5}Co−ONO]^{2+}, referred to as N-nitrito and O-nitrito, respectively. These two forms are sometimes called nitro and nitrito. These isomers can be interconverted in some complexes.

An example of chelating nitrite is [Cu(bipy)_{2}(O_{2}N)]NO_{3} – "bipy" is the bidentate ligand 2,2′-bipyridyl. This bonding mode is sometimes described as κ^{2O,O}-NO_{2}..

The kinetically-favored O-bonded isomer [(NH_{3})_{5}Co−ONO]^{2+} converts to [(NH_{3})_{5}Co−NO_{2}]^{2+}. In its reaction with ferric porphyrin complexes, nitrite gives the O-bonded isomer, Fe(porph)ONO. Addition of donor ligands to this complex induces the conversion to the octahedral low-spin isomer, which now is a soft Lewis acid. The nitrite isomerizes to the N-bonded isomer, Fe(porph)NO_{2}(L).

The isomerization of [(NH_{3})_{5}Co−ONO]^{2+} to [(NH_{3})_{5}Co−NO_{2}]^{2+} proceeds in an intramolecular manner.

=== Ligand properties ===
N- and O-bonding NO_{2}^{−} are classified as X ligands in the Covalent bond classification method. In the usual electron counting method, N- and O-bonded NO_{2}^{−} anions are two-electron ligands. With respect to HSAB theory, the N-bonded ligand is soft than the isomeric O-bonded form.

=== Homoleptic complexes ===
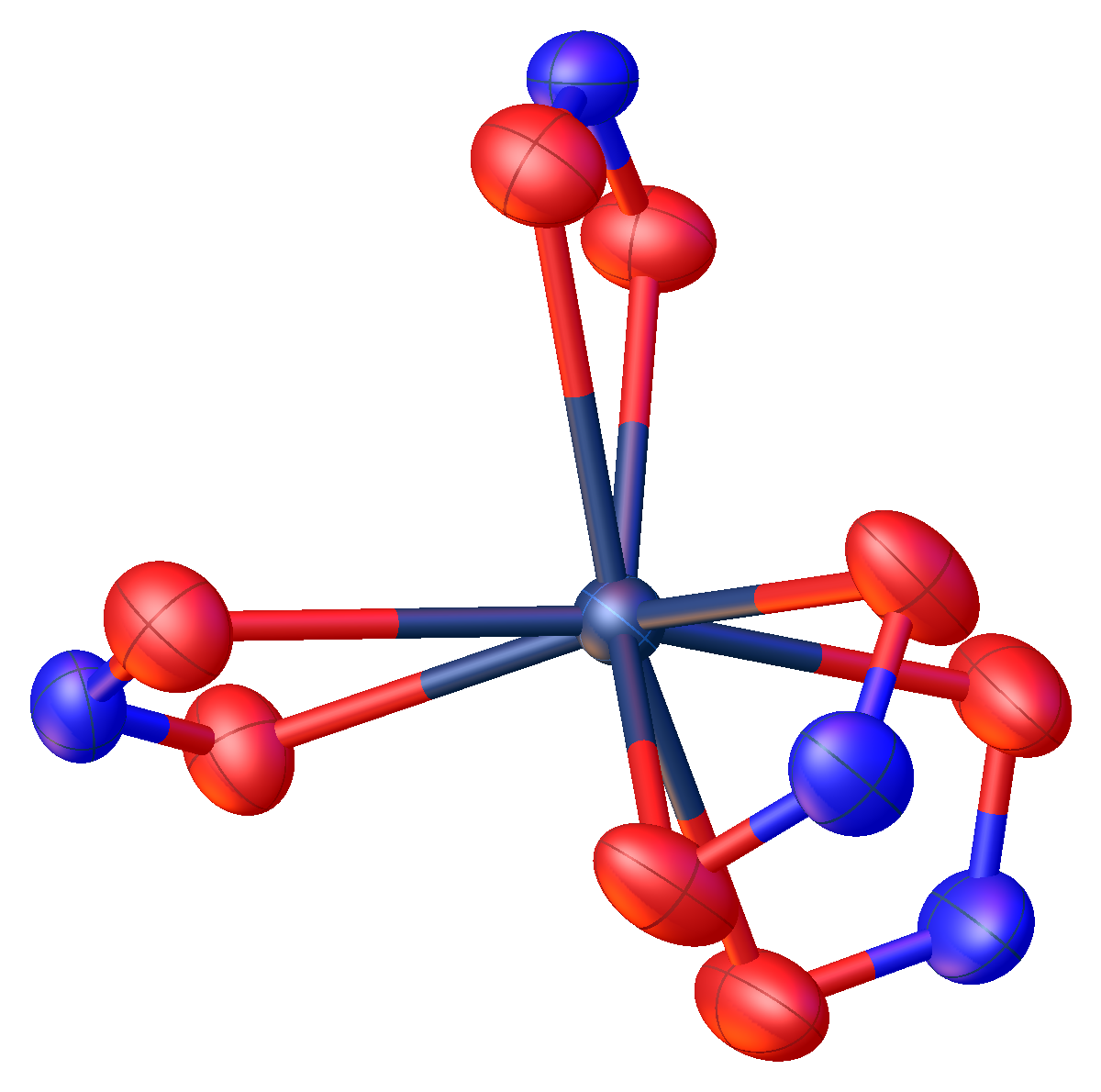
[Cd(NO_{2})_{4}]^{2−} center as occurs as the dipotassium salt (color code: red (O), blue (N)).

Several homoleptic (complexes with only one kind of ligand) complexes have been characterized by X-ray crystallography. The inventory includes octahedral complexes [M(NO_{2})_{6}]^{3−}, where M = Co (Sodium cobaltinitrite) and Rh. Square-planar homoleptic complexes are also known for Pt(II) and Pd(II). The potassium salts of [M(NO_{2})_{4}]^{2−} (M = Zn, Cd) feature homoleptic complexes with four O,O-bidentate nitrite ligands.

== Synthesis of nitrito complexes ==
Traditionally metal nitrito complexes are prepared by salt metathesis or ligand substitution reactions using alkali metal nitrite salts, such as sodium nitrite. At neutral pH, nitrite exists predominantly as the anion, not nitrous acid.

Metal nitrosyl complexes undergo base hydrolysis, yielding nitrite complexes. This pattern is manifested in the behavior of nitroprusside:

[Fe(CN)_{5}NO]^{2−} + 2 OH^{−} → [Fe(CN)_{5}NO_{2}]^{4−} + H_{2}O

== Reactions of nitrito complexes ==
Some anionic nitrito complexes undergo acid-induced deoxygenation to give the nitrosyl complex.

[L_{n}MNO_{2}]^{−} + H^{+} → [L_{n}MNO]^{+} + OH^{−}

The reaction is reversible in some cases. Thus, one can generate nitrito complexes by base-hydrolysis of electrophilic metal nitrosyls.

Nitro complexes also catalyze the oxidation of alkenes.

== Bioinorganic chemistry ==
Metal nitrito complexes figure prominently in the nitrogen cycle, which describes the relationships and interconversions of ammonia up to nitrate. Because nitrogen is often a limiting nutrient, this cycle is important. Nitrite itself does not readily undergo redox reactions, but its metal complexes do.

=== Oxidation to nitrate ===
The molybdenum-containing enzyme nitrite oxidoreductase catalyzes the oxidation of nitrite to nitrate:

NO^{−}_{2} + H_{2}O → NO^{−}_{3} + 2 H^{+}

=== Reduction ===
The heme-based enzyme nitrite reductase catalyzes the conversion of nitrite to ammonia. The cycle begins with reduction of an iron-nitrite complex to a metal nitrosyl complex.

The copper-containing enzyme nitrite reductase (CuNIR) catalyzes the 1-electron reduction of nitrite to nitric oxide. The proposed mechanism entails the protonation of a κ^{2O,O}-NO_{2}-Cu(I) complex. This protonation induces cleavage of an N–O bond, giving a HO–Cu–ON center, which features a nitric oxide ligand O-bonded to Cu(II) (an isonitrosyl).

== Related compounds ==
- NH_{4}[Co(NO_{2})_{4}(NH_{3})_{2}], "Erdmann's salt".
