= 1,5-Dithiacyclooctane =

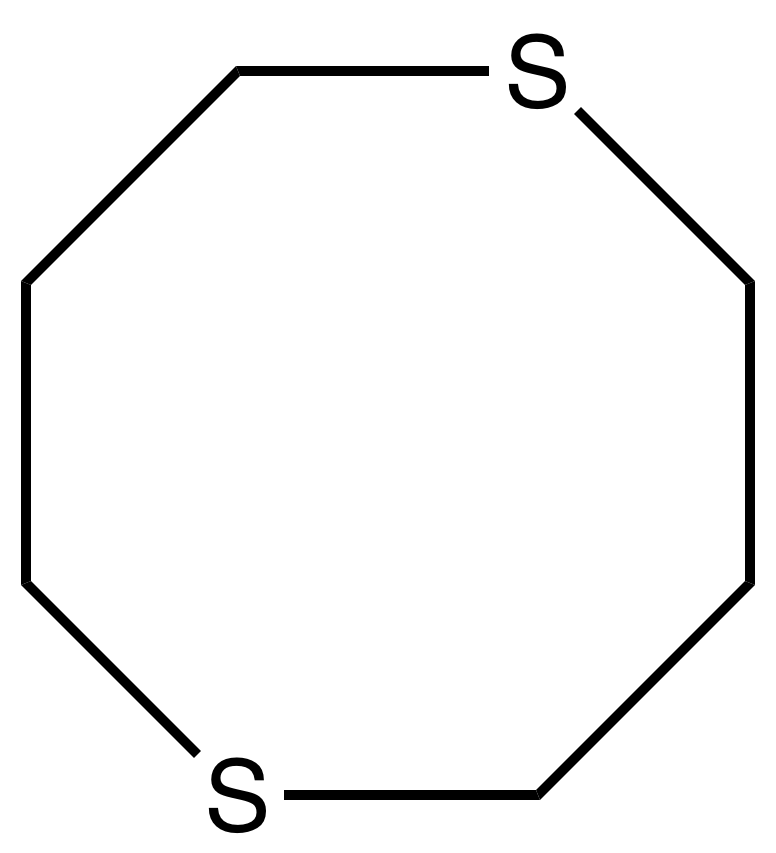

Names
- Preferred IUPAC name 1,5-Dithiacycloocane
- Other names DTCO

Identifiers
CAS Number	6572-95-8
3D model (JSmol)	Interactive image
ChemSpider	4424845
PubChem CID	5259509
UNII	CBX3CT6479
CompTox Dashboard (EPA)	DTXSID201337159
- InChI: InChI=1S/C6H12S2/c1-3-7-5-2-6-8-4-1/h1-6H2 Key: QQMWBFKOHYFXKQ-UHFFFAOYSA-N
- SMILES: C1CSCCCSC1

Properties
Chemical formula	C_{6}H_{12}S_{2}
Molar mass	148.28 g·mol^{−1}
Appearance	colorless liquid
Melting point	−15 °C (5 °F; 258 K)
Boiling point	245–6 °C (473–43 °F; 518–279 K)
- Except where otherwise noted, data are given for materials in their standard state (at 25 °C [77 °F], 100 kPa). Infobox references

1,5-Dithiacyclooctane (DTCO) is an organosulfur compound with the formula (CH_{2}CH_{2})CH_{2}S)_{2}. This cyclic dithioether is a colorless oil that is soluble in polar solvents. It forms a variety of transition metal thioether complexes.

DTO can be oxidized to the bicyclic dication.

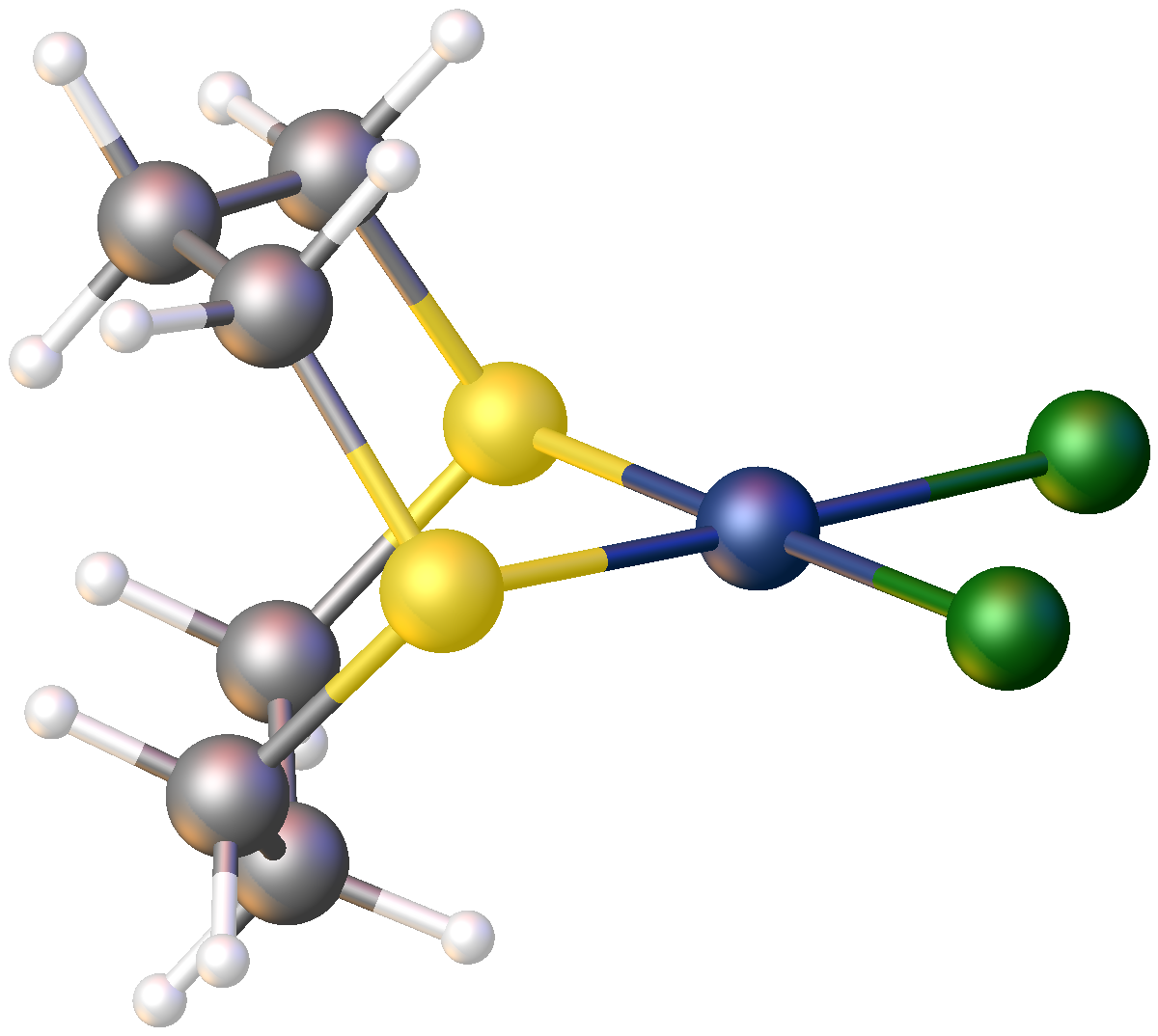
Structure of (DTCO)PdCl_{2}.

DTCO was first prepared in 4% yield by dialkylation of 1,3-propanedithiol with 1,3-dibromopropane.
