= Sulfoxide =

Organic compound containing a sulfinyl group (>SO)

Sulfoxide group

In organic chemistry, a sulfoxide, also called a sulphoxide, is an organosulfur compound containing a sulfinyl (>SO) functional group attached to two carbon atoms. It is a polar functional group. Sulfoxides are oxidized derivatives of sulfides. Examples of important sulfoxides are alliin, a precursor to the compound that gives freshly crushed garlic its aroma, and dimethyl sulfoxide (DMSO), a common solvent.

== Structure and bonding ==
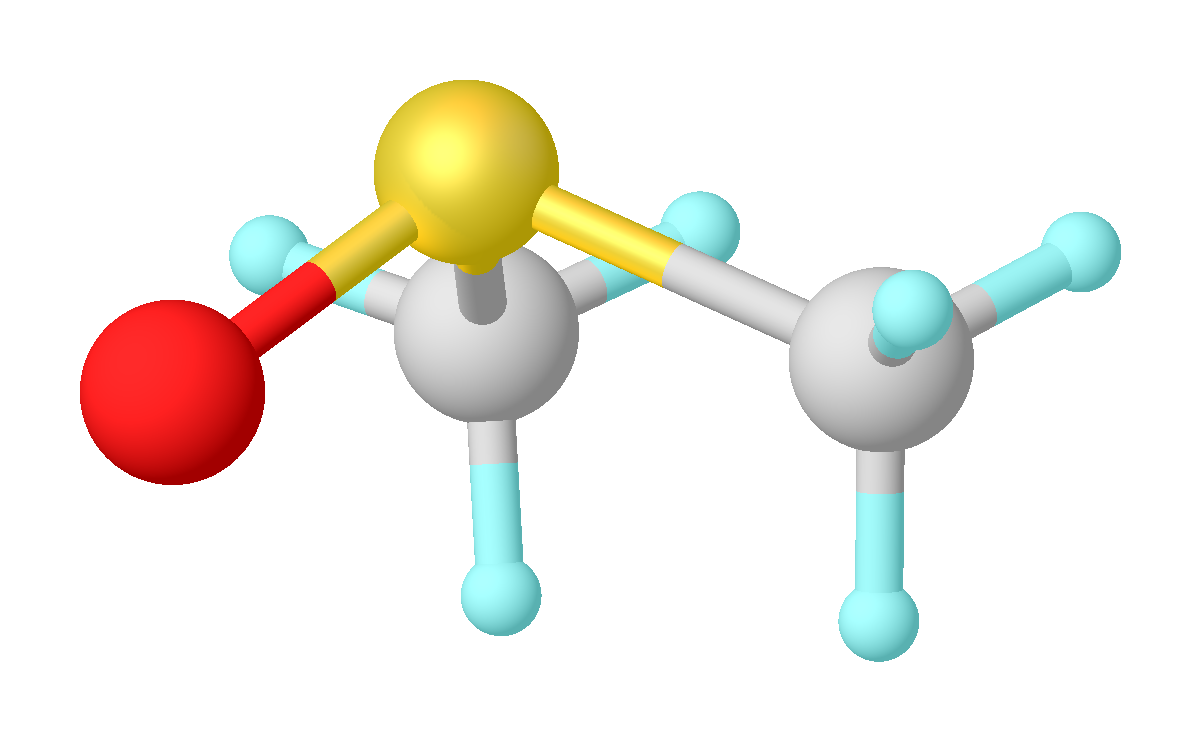
Structure of DMSO (red = O, yellow = S) as determined by X-ray crystallography of PdBr_{2}(bipy)·DMSO.

Sulfoxides feature relatively short S–O distances. In DMSO, the S–O distance is 1.531 Å. The sulfur center is pyramidal; the sum of the angles at sulfur is about 306°. Sulfoxides are generally represented with the structural formula R−S(=O)−R', where R and R' are organic groups. The bond between the sulfur and oxygen atoms is intermediate of a dative bond and a polarized double bond. The double-bond resonance form implies 10 electrons around sulfur (10-S-3 in N-X-L notation). The double-bond character of the S−O bond may be accounted for by donation of electron density into C−S antibonding orbitals ("no-bond" resonance forms in valence-bond language). Nevertheless, due to its simplicity and lack of ambiguity, the IUPAC recommends use of the expanded octet double-bond structure to depict sulfoxides, rather than the dipolar structure or structures that invoke "no-bond" resonance contributors. The S–O interaction has an electrostatic aspect, resulting in significant dipolar character, with negative charge centered on oxygen.

=== Chirality ===
Enantiomers of methyl phenyl sulfoxide.

A lone pair of electrons resides on the sulfur atom, giving it tetrahedral electron-pair geometry and trigonal pyramidal shape (steric number 4 with one lone pair; see VSEPR theory). When the two organic residues are dissimilar, the sulfur atom is a chiral center, for example, in methyl phenyl sulfoxide. The energy barrier required to invert this stereocenter is sufficiently high that sulfoxides are optically stable near room temperature. That is, the rate of racemization is slow at room temperature. The enthalpy of activation for racemization is in the range 35 to 42 kcal/mol and the corresponding entropy of activation is −8 to +4 cal/(mol·K). The barriers are lower for allylic and benzylic substituents.

== Preparation ==
Sulfoxides are typically prepared by oxidation of sulfides, sometimes referred to as sulfoxidation. Hydrogen peroxide is a typical oxidant, but periodate and aqueous N-halogenated amide reagents have also been used. Autoxidation occurs through a hydroperoxy intermediate. In these oxidations, care is required to avoid over oxidation to form the sulfone. For example, dimethyl sulfide oxidizes initially to dimethyl sulfoxide, but can then oxidize further to dimethyl sulfone.

Unsymmetrical sulfides are prochiral — their oxidation gives chiral sulfoxides. The process can be performed enantioselectively, through e.g., a variant of the Shi epoxidation, using certain transition metal catalysts, or biotransformation.

Symmetrical sulfoxides can be formed from a diorganylzinc compound and liquid sulfur dioxide.

=== Aryl sulfoxides ===
In addition to the oxidation routes, diaryl sulfoxides can be prepared by two Friedel–Crafts arylations of sulfur dioxide using an acid catalyst:

2 ArH + SO_{2} → Ar_{2}SO + H_{2}O

Both aryl sulfinyl chlorides and diaryl sulfoxides can be also prepared from arenes through reaction with thionyl chloride in the presence of Lewis acid catalysts such as BiCl_{3}, Bi(OTf)_{3}, LiClO_{4}, or NaClO_{4}.

== Reactions ==
=== Deoxygenation and oxygenation ===
Sulfoxides undergo deoxygenation to give sulfides. Typically metal complexes are used to catalyze the reaction, using hydrosilanes as the stoichiometric reductant. The deoxygenation of dimethylsulfoxide is catalyzed by DMSO reductase, a molybdoenzyme:

OSMe_{2} + 2 e^{−} + 2 H^{+} → SMe_{2} + H_{2}O

Stoichiometric reductions typically rely on strong acid activators, and resemble the various sulfonium-based oxidations of alcohols to aldehydes.

=== Acid-base reactions ===
The α-CH groups of alkyl sulfoxides are susceptible to deprotonation by strong bases, such as sodium hydride:

CH_{3}S(O)CH_{3} + NaH → CH_{3}S(O)CH_{2}Na + H_{2}

In the Mislow-Evans rearrangement, the resulting carbanion undergoes a [2,3] shift to give an allylic alkoxide.

In the Pummerer rearrangement, alkyl sulfoxides react with acetic anhydride to give migration of the oxygen from sulfur to the adjacent carbon as an acetate ester. The first step of the reaction sequence involves the sulfoxide oxygen acting as a nucleophile:

=== Elimination reactions ===
Sulfoxide undergo thermal elimination via an E_{i} mechanism to yield vinyl alkenes and sulfenic acids.

CH_{3}S(O)CH_{2}CH_{2}R → CH_{3}SOH + CH_{2}=CHR

The acids are powerful antioxidants, but lack long-term stability. Some parent sulfoxides are therefore marketed as antioxidant polymer stabilisers. Structures based on thiodipropionate esters are popular. The reverse reaction is possible.

=== Coordination chemistry ===
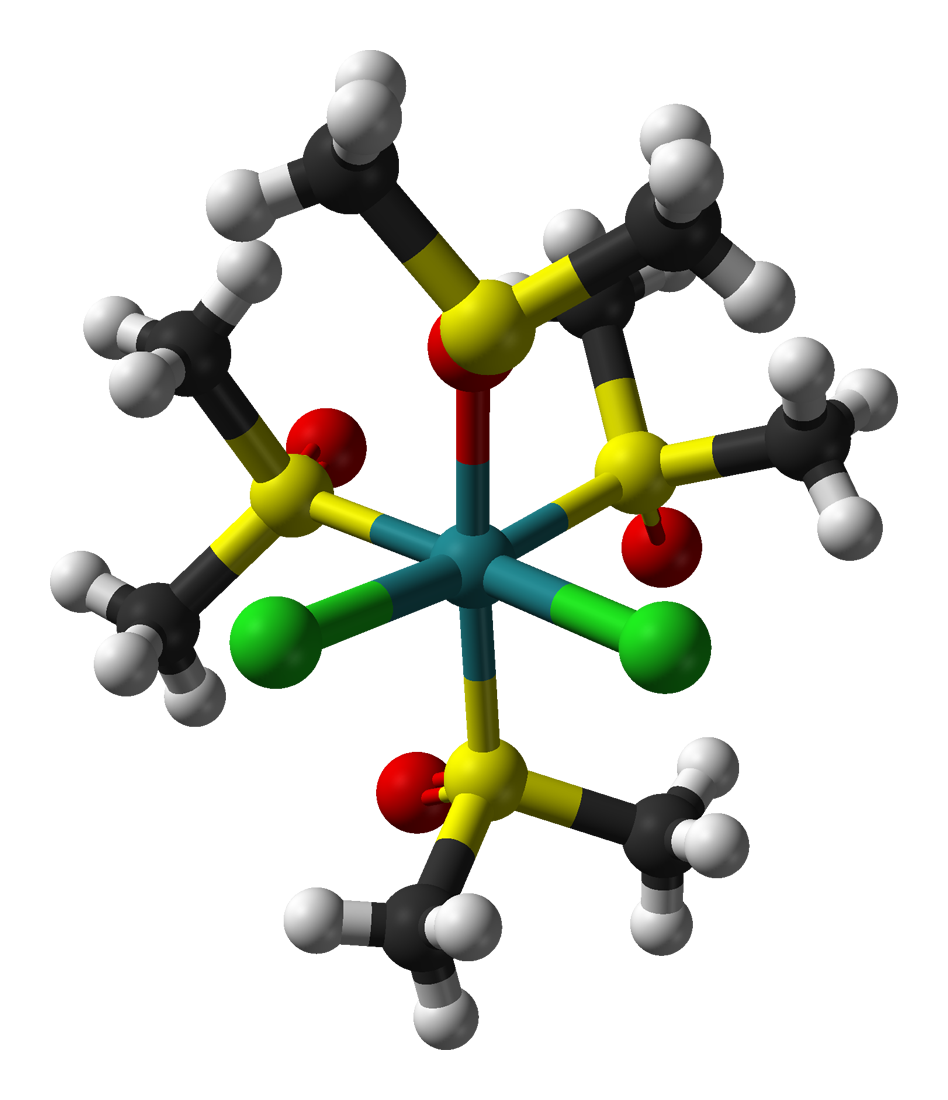
cis-RuCl_{2}(dmso)_{4}, a representative metal complex of a sulfoxide. Three DMSO ligands are S-bonded to Ru, one is O-bonded.

Sulfoxides, especially DMSO, form coordination complexes with transition metals. Depending on the hard-soft properties of the metal, the sulfoxide binds through either the sulfur or the oxygen atom. The latter is particularly common.

== Applications and occurrence ==
Esomeprazole, a blockbuster drug, is an enantiopure drug containing a sulfoxide functional group. The related drug omeprazole is the racemic version.

DMSO is a widely used solvent.

The sulfoxide functional group occurs in several drugs. Notable is esomeprazole, the optically pure form of the proton-pump inhibitor omeprazole. Another commercially important sulfoxides include armodafinil.

Methionine sulfoxide forms from the amino acid methionine and its accumulation is associated with aging. The enzyme DMSO reductase catalyzes the interconversion of DMSO and dimethylsulfide.

Naturally occurring chiral sulfoxides include alliin and ajoene.
