= Sodium hexanitritocobaltate(III) =

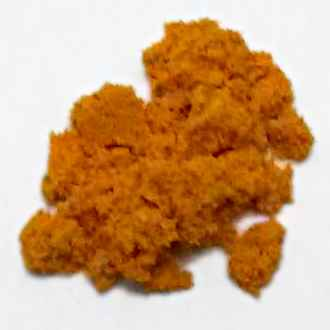

Names
- IUPAC name Sodium hexanitritocobaltate(III)
- Other names Sodium cobaltinitrite

Identifiers
CAS Number	13600-98-1
3D model (JSmol)	Interactive image
ChemSpider	13198283
ECHA InfoCard	100.033.692
EC Number	237-077-7
PubChem CID	16211641
UNII	XO0NGY9EY7
CompTox Dashboard (EPA)	DTXSID00894906
- InChI: InChI=1S/Co.6NO2.3Na/c;6*2-1-3;;;/q-3;;;;;;;3*+1 Key: IMBXIBFCGMYSME-UHFFFAOYSA-N; InChI=1/Co.6NO2.3Na/c;6*2-1-3;;;/q-3;;;;;;;3*+1/rCoN6O12.3Na/c8-2(9)1(3(10)11,4(12)13,5(14)15,6(16)17)7(18)19;;;/q-3;3*+1 Key: IMBXIBFCGMYSME-PEVTYUNUAJ
- SMILES: [Na+].[Na+].[Na+].O=[N+]([O-])[Co-3]([N+]([O-])=O)([N+](=O)[O-])([N+]([O-])=O)([N+]([O-])=O)[N+]([O-])=O

Properties
Chemical formula	Na_{3}[Co(NO_{2})_{6}]
Molar mass	403.933 g·mol^{−1}
Appearance	Yellow crystals
Density	2.565 g/cm^{3}

Hazards
- GHS labelling
Pictograms	(GHS03: Oxidizing) (GHS07: Exclamation mark) (GHS08: Health hazard)
Signal word	Danger
Hazard statements	H272, H315, H317, H319, H334, H335, H351
Safety data sheet (SDS)	JT Baker MSDS

Related compounds
Other cations	Potassium hexanitritocobaltate(III)
- Except where otherwise noted, data are given for materials in their standard state (at 25 °C [77 °F], 100 kPa). verify (what is ?) Infobox references

Sodium hexanitritocobaltate(III) is an inorganic compound with the formula Na_{3}[Co(NO_{2})_{6}]. The anion of this yellow-coloured salt consists of the transition metal nitrite complex [Co(NO_{2})_{6}]^{3−}. It was a reagent for the qualitative test for potassium and ammonium ions.

== Synthesis and reactions ==
The compound is prepared by oxidation of cobalt(II) salts in the presence of sodium nitrite:

4 [Co(H_{2}O)_{6}](NO_{3})_{2} + O_{2} + 24 NaNO_{2} → 4 Na_{3}[Co(NO_{2})_{6}] + 8 NaNO_{3} + 4 NaOH + 22 H_{2}O

== Application for analysis of potassium ==
Although the sodium cobaltinitrite is soluble in water, it forms the basis of a quantitative determination of potassium, thallium, and ammonium ions. Under the recommended reaction conditions the insoluble double salt, K_{2}Na[Co(NO_{2})_{6}]·H_{2}O is precipitated and weighed. In geochemical analysis, sodium cobaltinitrite is used to distinguish alkali feldspars from plagioclase feldspars in thin section.

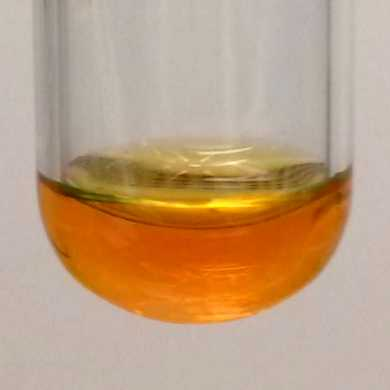
Concentrated aqueous solution of sodium cobaltinitrite.

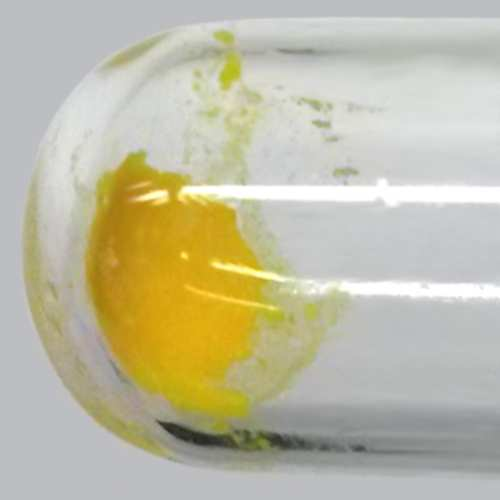
K_{2}Na[Co(NO_{2})_{6}]·H_{2}O precipitate

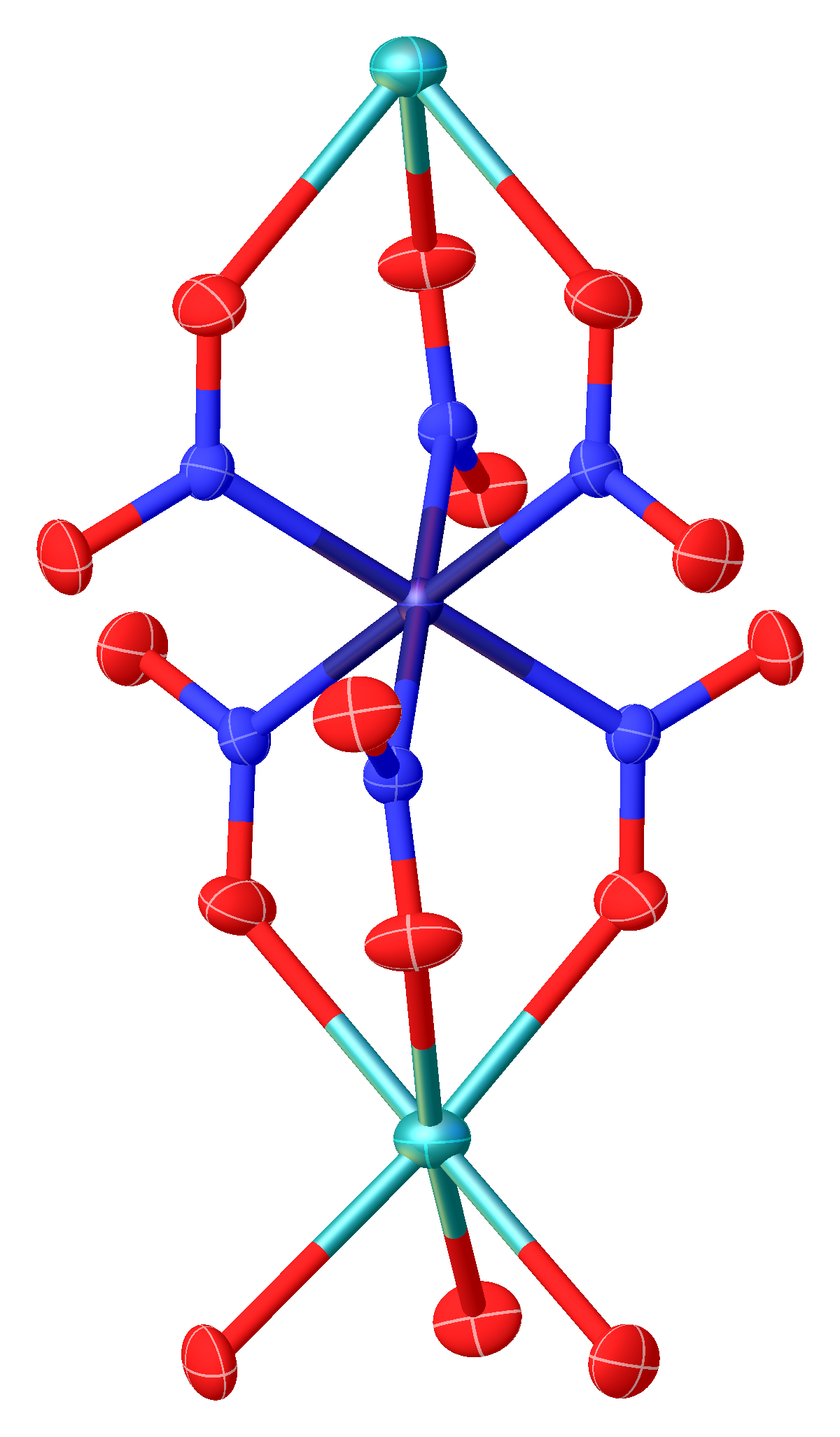
