= Trimethylsulfoxonium iodide =

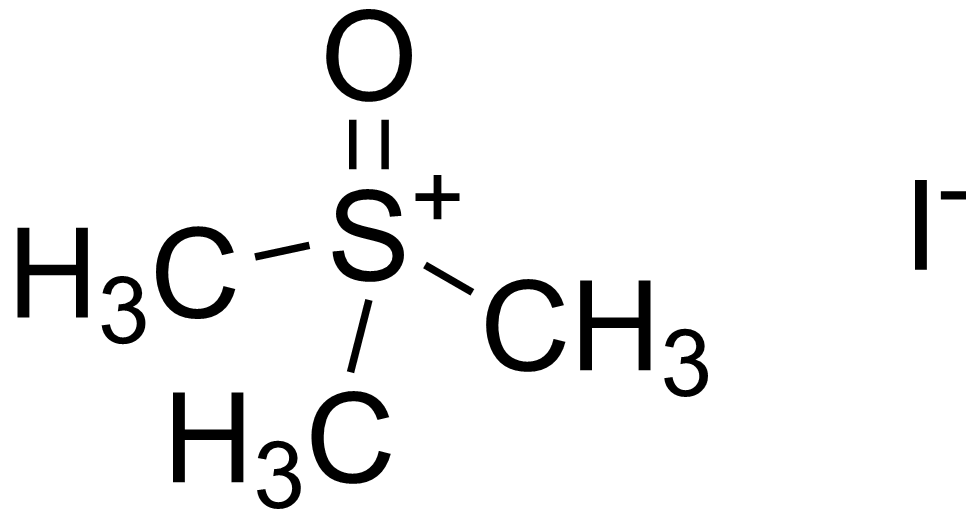

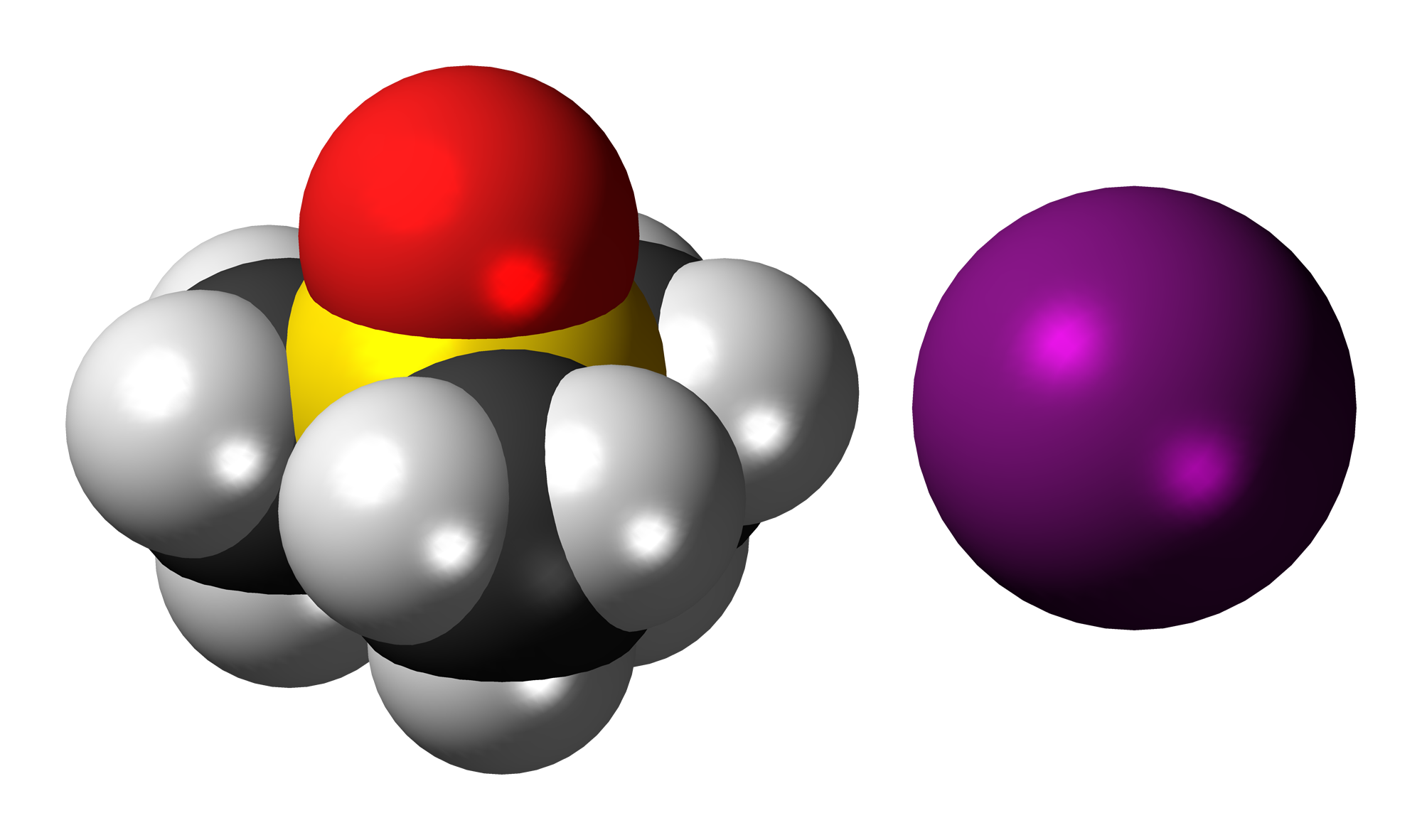

Names
- Preferred IUPAC name Trimethyl(oxo)-λ^{4}-sulfanium iodide
- Other names: Trimethylsulphoxonium iodide; Trimethyloxosulfonium iodide; S,S,S-Trimethylsulfoxonium iodide

Identifiers
| CAS Number | 1774-47-6 |
| 3D model (JSmol) | Interactive image |
| ChEMBL | ChEMBL283149 |
| ChemSpider | 67079 |
| ECHA InfoCard | 100.015.641 |
| EC Number | 217-204-2 |
| PubChem CID | 74498 |
| CompTox Dashboard (EPA) | DTXSID001014581 |
- InChI: InChI=1S/C3H9OS.HI/c1-5(2,3)4;/h1-3H3;1H/q+1;/p-1 Key: BPLKQGGAXWRFOE-UHFFFAOYSA-M
- SMILES: O=[S+](C)(C)C.[I-]

Properties
| Chemical formula | [(CH_{3})_{3}SO]I |
| Molar mass | 220.07 g·mol^{−1} |
| Appearance | Colorless solid |
| Melting point | 208 to 212 °C (406 to 414 °F; 481 to 485 K) |
- Except where otherwise noted, data are given for materials in their standard state (at 25 °C [77 °F], 100 kPa). verify (what is ?) Infobox references

Trimethylsulfoxonium iodide is an organosulfur compound with the chemical formula [(CH_{3})_{3}S=O]^{+}I^{−}. It is a sulfoxonium salt derived from dimethylsulfoxide. It is iodide salt of a common sulfoxonium cation. This compound, a colorless solid, is commercially available. It may be prepared by the alkylation of dimethyl sulfoxide with iodomethane:

(CH_{3})_{2}SO + CH_{3}I → [(CH_{3})_{3}SO]^{+}I^{−}

The trimethylsulfoxonium ion features a tetrahedral molecular geometry at sulfur center. The ion has idealized C_{3v} symmetry. It is isoelectronic with trimethylphosphine oxide.

Trimethylsulfoxonium iodide is used to generate dimethyloxosulfonium methylide by reaction with sodium hydride. The latter compound is used to prepare epoxides from ketones and aldehydes.
