= Nitrate chlorides =

Class of chemical compounds

Nitrate chlorides are mixed anion compounds that contain both nitrate (NO_{3}^{−}) and chloride (Cl^{−}) ions. Various compounds are known, including amino acid salts, and also complexes from iron group, rare-earth, and actinide metals. Complexes are not usually identified as nitrate chlorides, and would be termed chlorido nitrato complexes.

== Formation ==
Nitrate chloride compounds may be formed by mixing solutions of chloride and nitrate slats, the addition of nitric acid to a chloride salt solution, or the addition of hydrochloric acid to a nitrate solution. Most commonly water is used as a solvent, but other solvents such as methylene dichloride, methanol or ethanol can be used.

== Minerals ==
name	formula	ratio NO_{3}:Cl	mw	system	space group	unit cell Å	volume	density	optical	references
Buttgenbachite	Cu_{19}(NO_{3})_{2}(OH)_{32}Cl_{4} · 2H_{2}O	2:4		hexagonal	P6_{3}/mmc	a = 15.75 Å, c = 9.161 Å Z=1	1968	4.538	Blue Uniaxial (+) n_{ω} = 1.738 n_{ε} = 1.752 birefringence: δ = 0.014	
Lislkirchnerite	Pb_{6}Al(OH)_{8}Cl_{2}(NO_{3})_{5}·2H_{2}O	5:2		monoclinic	P2_{1}/n	a = 10.7834(6) Å, b = 9.0584(5) Å, c = 13.6178(9) Å β = 102.28(2)°	1300			
Sveite	KAl_{7}(NO_{3})_{4}(OH)_{16}Cl_{2} · 8H_{2}O	4:2		Monoclinic		a = 10.89 Å, b = 13.04 Å, c = 30.71 Å β = 92.1°	4,358		white Biaxial (+) n_{α} = 1.501 n_{β} = 1.503 n_{γ} = 1.535 2V: calculated = 30° Max Birefringence = δ = 0.034	
	Pb_{8}O_{3}(OH)_{5}(NO_{3})_{4}Cl	4:1		Monoclinic		a = 14.831(3) Å, b = 7.659(2) Å, c = 10.186(2) Å β = 108.64(3)°	1096		colourless	

== List ==
name	formula	ratio NO_{3}:Cl	mw	system	space group	unit cell Å	volume	density	comment	references
Chlorine nitrate	O_{2}NOCl			orthorhombic	P2_{1}2_{1}2_{1}	a = 3.856 b = 6.755 c = 12.07 Z=46	314.5	2.058	at −166 °C (related compound)	
anilinium chloride nitrate	(C_{6}H_{8}N)_{2}ClNO_{3}	1:1		triclinic	P1̅	a = 8.418 b = 9.648 c = 10.036 α = 62.993° β = 86.798° γ = 72.999°				
o-Phenylenediaminium chloride nitrate				orthorhombic	Pnma	a = 7.3695 b = 8.2367 c = 14.2398 Z=4	864.36	1.596		
l-lysinium(2+) chloride nitrate	L-Lys^{2+}·Cl^{−}·NO_{3}^{−}	1:1		monoclinic	P2_{1}	a 8.8022 b 7.0096 c 20.2169 β 95.226°				
L-Lysine L-lysinium dichloride nitrate	2C_{6}H_{15}N_{2}O_{2}^{+}·H^{+}·NO_{3}^{−}·2Cl^{−}	1:2	428.32	orthorhombic	P2_{1}2_{1}2_{1}	a 4.9846 b 20.604 c 20.663 Z=4	2122.1	1.341	colourless	
L-cysteinium sodium nitrate chloride		1:1		monoclinic	P2_{1}	a=18.5, b=5.22, c=7.22 β=103.83°	678		transparent from 328 to 1400 nm; SHG 0.51 ×KDP	
Bis(L-ornithinium) chloride nitrate sulfate	2C_{5}H_{14}N_{2}O_{2}^{2+}·Cl^{−}·NO_{3}^{−}·SO_{4}^{2-}		461.88	monoclinic	C2	a 13.872 b 9.578 c 9.178 β 125.35° Z=2	994.6	1.542		
(μ_{4}-octahydroxycucurbit(5)uril)-(μ_{2}-nitrato)-aqua-di-potassium chloride nonahydrate	{[K(H_{2}O)](NO_{3}⊂C_{30}H_{28}N_{20}O_{20})[K(η^{2}-NO_{3})]}Cl(H_{3}O)_{2}^{2+}·7H_{2}O			monoclinic	P2_{1}/c	a 13.8265 b 14.2642 c 25.143 β 92.711° Z=4	4953.2	1.806	colourless	
	CaClNO_{3}•H_{2}O			orthorhombic	Pbca					
Thecotrichite	Ca_{3}(CH_{3}COO)_{3}Cl(NO_{3})_{2} • 6H_{2}O	2:1		monoclinic	P2_{1}/c	a 23.5933 b 13.8459 c 6.8010 β 95.195° Z=4	2212.57		anthropogenic, formed on ceramics in damp wooden cupboards; refractive index: n_{x} = 1.491 n_{z} = 1.494 stable to 110 °C	
di-μ-hydroxido-bis[triaqua(nitrato-κ^{2}O,O′)scandium(III)] dichloride	[Sc_{2}(NO_{3})_{2}(OH)_{2}(H_{2}O)_{6}]Cl_{2}	1:1	426.95	triclinic	P1̅	a=6.7221 b=7.6279 c=8.5181 α=100.904° β=110.125° γ=102.329° Z=1	383.87	1.847	colourless @100K	
	Co(NH_{3})_{5}NO_{2}ClNO_{3}			orthorhombic	Pna2_{1}					
	[Fe(Cl)_{4}](Fe(NO_{3})_{2}(OPPh_{2}py)_{2}									
	[Fe(NO_{3})_{2}(Cl)(OPPh_{2}py)]· CH_{2}Cl_{2}			monoclinic	P2_{1}/n	a 9.138 b 15.69 c 16.68 β 94.50°				
hexamethylphosphoric triamide	Fe(NO_{3})_{2}(Cl)(HMPA)_{1.5}									
hexamethylphosphoric triamide	Fe(NO_{3})_{2}(Cl)(HMPA)_{2}									
hexamethylphosphoric triamide	Fe(NO_{3})(Cl)_{2}(HMPA)_{2}			monoclinic	P2_{1}/c	a 15.994 b 10.172 c 16.571 β 104.7°				
pypn=N,N′-bis(2-pyridylmethyl)-1,3-propanediamine (N,N'-bis((pyridin-2-yl)methyl)propane-1,3-diamine)-dichloro-iron(iii) nitrate	[Fe(pypn)Cl_{2}](NO_{3})			monoclinic	P2_{1}/c	a 11.848 b 12.474 c 12.301 β 94.56°			Cl in cis position	
pentaamminenitrocobalt(III) chloride nitrate	[Co(NH_{3})_{5}NO_{2}](NO_{3})Cl			orthorhombic	Pnam	a 14.814 b 9.623 c 7.309			@290K; photosalient (jumps under UV)	
trans-Dichloro-bis(ethylenediamine)-cobalt(III) nitrate	[Co en_{2}Cl_{2}]NO_{3}			monoclinic	P2_{1}/n	a = 6.348 b = 9.304 c = 9.853 β = 101.79°	569.6	1.82	green	
cis-Chloro(ammine)bis(ethylenediamine)cobalt dinitrate	[Co(en)_{2}(NH_{3})Cl](NO_{3})_{2}									
trans-Chloro(ammine)bis(ethylenediamine)cobalt dinitrate	[Co(en)_{2}(NH_{3})Cl](NO_{3})_{2}									
5-nitrosalicyliddineaminato tetraamino cobalt dichloride nitrate									orange	
cis-Chlorobis(ethylenediamine)dodecylaminecobalt(III) nitrate	cis-[Co(en)_{2}(C_{12}H_{25}NH_{2})Cl](NO_{3})_{2}									
bis(1,4,7-triazacyclononane) nickel(ii) nitrate chloride monohydrate	[Ni([9]aneN_{3})_{2}](NO_{3})Cl·H_{2}O			orthorhombic	Pna2_{1}	a 17.584 b 8.860 c 12.141				
Bis[chlorobis(1,10-phenanthroline-N,N')(thiourea-S)nickel(II)] chloride nitrate diethanol solvate	[NiCl(C_{12}H_{8}N_{2})_{2}(CH_{4}N_{2}S)]_{2}(NO_{3})Cl·2C_{2}H_{6}O			orthorhombic	Fdd2	a 22.813 b 29.024 c 17.113 Z=8	11331	1.467	blue	
Cucurbit[8]uril (1-n-butyl-4,4'-bipyridin-1-ium 1-n-butyl-4,4'-bipyridin-1-ium-penta-aqua-nickel(ii)) clathrate chloride trinitrate undecahydrate	{[C_{14}H_{17}N_{2}Ni(H_{2}O)_{5}]_{2}⊂C_{48}H_{48}N_{32}O_{16}}[(C_{14}H_{17}N_{2})_{2}⊂C_{48}H_{48}N_{32}O_{16}]Cl_{2}(NO_{3})_{6}·22H_{2}O			triclinic	P1̅	a 16.671 b 16.678 c 20.442 α 112.772° β 101.844° γ 90.102°				
bis(bis(1,4,7-triazacyclonon-1-yl)pentane)-di-nickel(ii) trichloride nitrate pentadecahydrate	[Ni_{2}(EM5)_{2}]Cl_{3}NO_{3}·15H_{2}O			orthorhombic	Pbcn	a 28.030 b 17.469 c 12.289				
bis(bis(1,4,7-triazacyclonon-1-yl)hexane)-di-nickel(ii) dichloride dinitrate hexahydrate	[Ni_{2}(EM6)_{2}]Cl_{3}(NO_{3})_{2}·6H_{2}O			triclinic	P1̅	a 9.529 b 9.566 c 14.684 α 81.08° β 78.84° γ 88.82°				
dapsc = 2,6-diacetylpyridine-bis(semicarbazone))	[Ni(dapsc)(H_{2}O)_{2}]Cl(NO_{3})·H_{2}O			triclinic	P1̅	a=6.9130 b=12.3410 α=114.8010 β=93.946 γ=103.7760 Z=2	933.10	1.735	green	
hexakis(1H-imidazole)-nickel(ii) chloride nitrate tetrahydrate	[Ni(Im)_{6}][(NO_{3})Cl(H_{2}O)_{4}]			hexagonal	P6_{3}m	a 9.003 c 21.034				
bis(M-2-chloro)-(nitrato-o)-(2,2 '-bipyridine-N.N ')-copper(II)	Cu(2,2'-BP)Cl NO_{3}			triclinic	P1̅	a = 7.515 b = 9.253 c = 10.283 α=112.181° β= 102.155° γ= 105.617° Z=2	597.4	1.769	green; dimer	
bis(M-2-chloro)-(nitrato-o)-(2,2 '-4,4'-dimethylbipyridine-N.N ')-copper(II)	Cu(2,2'-dmBP)ClNO_{3}								dimer	
Chloro(1,10-phenanthroline-2-carboxamide oxime)copper(II) Nitrate										
bis(μ_{2}-2,4,4,6,6-pentakis(2-pyridyloxy)cyclo-2,4,6-triphosphazene 2-oxide)-dichloro-nitrato-cobalt(ii)-di-copper chloride	[{(N_{3}P_{3}(OC_{5}H_{4}N)_{5}(O)CuCl)_{2}Co(NO_{3})}Cl]			orthorhombic	Fddd	a =22.639 b =28.202 c =45.260				
Copper(II)–sparteine nitrate chloride	Cu^{II}{(−)Sp}(NO_{3})Cl			orthorhombic	P2_{1}2_{1}2_{1}	a 16.370 b 13.334 c 7.6803				
Cucurbit[8]uril (1-n-butyl-4,4'-bipyridin-1-ium 1-n-butyl-4,4'-bipyridin-1-ium-penta-aqua-copper(ii)) clathrate dichloride dinitrate hexadecahydrate	{[C_{14}H_{17}N_{2}Cu(H_{2}O)_{5}]_{2}⊂C_{48}H_{48}N_{32}O_{16}}[(C_{14}H_{17}N_{2})_{2}⊂C_{48}H_{48}N_{32}O_{16}]Cl_{4}(NO_{3})_{4}·32H_{2}O			triclinic	P1̅	a 16.607 b 17.093 c 20.509 α 66.003° β 77.568° γ 89.155°				
copper(II)-di-2-pyridylamine complex chloride nitrate (μ_{2}-Chloro)-(nitrato-O)-(bis(2-pyridyl)amine-N,N')-copper(ii) hemihydrate	[Cu(dipyam)Cl(NO_{3})].0.5H_{2}O			monoclinic	P2_{1}/a	a 7.382 b 21.494 c 8.032 β 94.26				
tipa=tri(4-imidazolylphenyl)amine (μ_{3}-tris(4-(Imidazol-1-yl)phenyl)amine)-chloro-zinc nitrate dimethylformamide solvate	[Zn(tipa)Cl]•NO_{3}•2 DMF			orthorhombic	Pnna	a=28.470 b=27.784 c=9.255	7321	1.044		
	(NH_{4})_{3}ZnNO_{3}Cl_{4}			orthorhombic	Pnna	a=9.303 b=10.048 c=12.454 Z=4	1164.2	1.845	UV edge 243 nm; birefringence 0.085@546 nm	
	K_{3}ZnCl_{4}NO_{3}			orthorhombic	Pnna					
	Na_{3}Rb_{6}(CO_{3})_{3}(NO_{3})_{2}Cl·(H_{2}O)_{6}	2:1	1029.39	hexagonal	P6_{3}/mcm	a = 9.5732 c = 15.820 Z=2	1255.6	2.723	UV cut off 231 nm; uniaxial; birefringence 0.14 @ 546 nm	
	KRb_{2}(NO_{3})_{2}Cl	2:1	369.51	orthorhombic	pbam	a=12.1863 b=12.4072 c=5.8203 Z=4	880.02	2.789	transparent; birefringence = 0.084 at 1064 nm	
	Rb_{2}Ca(NO_{3})_{2}Cl_{2}		405.94	tetragonal	I4_{1}/amd	a=5.4268 c=31.877 Z=4	938.77	2.872	colourless; birefringence 0.099	
	[Ru(NH_{3})_{5}Cl](NO_{3})_{2}			tetragonal	I4	a = 7.5811 b = 7.5811 c = 10.535	605.5	1.896	yellow	
	[RuNO(NH_{3})_{3}(H_{2}O)Cl](NO_{3})_{2}			monoclinic	Cc	a = 13.7924 b = 6.9114 c = 12.3577 β = 111.863° Z = 4	1093.27	2.185		
bis((μ_{2}-chloro)-(nitrato)-(η^{5}-pentamethylcyclopentadienyl)-rhodium(iii))	[Cp*Rh(η^{1}-NO_{3})(μ-Cl)]_{2}			monoclinic	P2_{1}/n	a 8.3874 b 10.4549 c 14.8585 β 104.385°				
chloro-(cyclohexylisocyano)-(η^{5}-pentamethylcyclopentadienyl)-(triphenylphosphine)-rhodium nitrite nitrate dihydrate	{[Cp*RhCl(PPh_{3})(CNC_{6}H_{11})]_{2}(NO_{2})(NO_{3})}·2H_{2}O			triclinic	P1	a 10.319 b 10.5582 c 17.371 α 97.011° β 94.35° γ 112.154°				
	[Rh(NH_{3})_{5}Cl](NO_{3})_{2}			tetragonal	I4	a = 7.5858 b = 7.5858 c = 10.41357 Z=2	599.24	1.926	yellow	
bis(μ_{2}-4'-(4-pyridyl)-2,2':6',2''-terpyridine)-bis(η^{5}-pentamethylcyclopentadienyl)-tetra-chloro-di-rhodium-nickel dinitrate methanol solvate dihydrate	{Cp*_{2}Rh_{2}[Ni(pyterpy)_{2}]Cl_{4}}(NO_{3})_{2}			monoclinic	C2/c	a 53.4454 b 8.8419 c 33.7700 β 112.029°				
cis-dichlorobis(ethylenediamine)rhodium(III) nitrate	[Rh(en)_{2}Cl_{2}]NO_{3}			triclinic	P1̅	a=8.619 b=6.528 c=11.687 α=I02.18 β=90.98 γ=112.46 Z=2	590.5	2.00	yellow	
trans-dichlorobis(ethylenediamine)rhodium(III) nitrate	[Rh(en)_{2}Cl_{2}]NO_{3}			monoclinic	P2_{1}/n	a = 6.441 b=9.281 c=10.010 β=102.42 Z=2	584.4	2.02	orange	
L=3,6,9,16,19,22-hexaazatricyclo[22.2.2.2^{11,14}]triacon-11,13,24,26(1),2 7,29-hexaene (μ_{2}-3,6,9,16,19,22-Hexa-azatricyclo(22.2.2.2^{11,14})triaconta-1(26),11,13,24,27,29-hexaene)-dichloro-di-palladium(ii) dinitrate monohydrate	[Pd_{2}LCl_{2}](NO_{3})_{2}·H_{2}O			monoclinic	P2/c	a 21.744 b 9.243 c 16.259 β 93.580°				
en=Ethylenediamine py=pyridine	[Pd(en)(py)Cl]NO_{3}			monoclinic	P2_{1}/c	a = 7.990, b = 16.058, c = 9.846 β = 103.81° Z = 4				
4-Methylpyridine,	[Pd(en)(4-Me-py)Cl]NO_{3}									
4-hydroxy-pyridine	[Pd(en)(4-OH-py)Cl]NO_{3}									
4-NH_{2}-py=4-aminopyridine	[Pd(en)(4-NH_{2}-py)Cl]NO_{3}									
	Ag_{2}ClNO_{3}				•					
tetrakis(μ-tris((diphenylphosphino)methyl)amine)-tetrachloro-pentadeca-silver tris(nitrate) octahydrate	[Ag_{15}(N-triphos)_{4}(Cl_{4})](NO_{3})_{3}		3649.32	orthorhombic	C222_{1}	a 18.702 b 36.975 c 28.652 Z=6	19813	1.835		
bis(tetrakis(Triphenylphosphine)-silver) chloro-diphenyl-bis(nitrato-O,O')-tin diphenyl-tris(nitrato-O,O')-tin	[Ag(PPh_{3})_{4}][SnPh_{2}(NO_{3})_{2}(Cl,NO_{3})]			triclinic	P1̅	a 22.43 b 14.13 c 13.96 α 90.59° β 69.82° γ 64.58°				
	Rb_{2}CdCl(NO_{3})(C_{2}O_{4})•H_{2}O			orthorhombic	Pbca					
	Cs_{2}Ca(NO_{3})_{2}Cl_{2}		500.82	tetragonal	I4_{1}/amd	a=5.5603 c=32.482 Z=4	1004.2	3.313	colourless; birefringence 0.104	
barium chloride nitrate	Ba(NO_{3})Cl			orthorhombic	Pnma	a 8.9108 b 5.2991 c 8.3414			UV cutoff 213 nm; birefringence 0.009 @ 1064 nm	
L_{SS=}trans-N,N′-bis(salicylidene)-(1S,2S)-cyclohexanediamine	[La(H_{2}L_{SS})(NO_{3})_{2}Cl]·2CH_{2}Cl_{2}			tetragonal	P4_{3}2_{1}2	a = 18.1798 c = 16.4174 Z=4	5426.0	1.150		
tris(μ_{2}-N',N''-((5-Chloro-2-oxy-1,3-phenylene)dimethylylidene)bis(benzohydrazide))-bis(ethanol)-di-lanthanum dinitrate chloride acetone solvate dihydrate	[La_{2}(H_{2}L^{1})_{3}(C_{2}H_{5}OH)_{2}]·(Cl)·(NO_{3})_{2}·((CH_{3})_{2}CO)_{2}·(H_{2}O)_{2}			monoclinic	C2/c	a 21.1020 b 18.5070 c 23.1880 β 114.452°				
L_{SS=}trans-N,N′-bis(salicylidene)-(1S,2S)-cyclohexanediamine	[Ce(H_{2}L_{SS})(NO_{3})_{2}Cl]·2CH_{2}Cl_{2}			tetragonal	P4_{3}2_{1}2	a = 18.216 c = 16.483 Z=4	5469.6	1.147		
Chloro-nitrato-pentakis(tetrahydrofuran)-cerium(iii) pentachloro-(tetrahydrofuran)-cerium(iv)	[CeCl(NO_{3})(THF)_{5}]^{+}[CeCl_{5}(THF)]^{−}			monoclinic	P2/c	a 12.138 b 11.299 c 14.066 β 104.31°				
Praseodymium dichloride nitrate pentahydrate	[PrCl_{2}(H_{2}O)_{6}][PrCl_{2}(NO_{3})_{2}(H_{2}O)_{4}]			monoclinic	P2/c	a = 12.288 b = 6.484 c = 12.660 β = 91.91° Z = 4			green	
L=N,N′‐bis (salicylidene)‐1,2‐cyclohexanediamine	[Pr(H_{2}L)_{2}(NO_{3})_{2}Cl]·2CH_{2}Cl_{2}		941.14	tetragonal	P4_{3}2_{1}2	a=18.0936 c=16.3490 Z=4	5352.3	1.168		
L_{SS=}trans-N,N′-bis(salicylidene)-(1S,2S)-cyclohexanediamine	[Nd(H_{2}L_{SS})(NO_{3})_{2}Cl]·2CH_{2}Cl_{2}			tetragonal	P4_{3}2_{1}2	a = 18.1041 c = 16.4374 Z=4	5387.5	1.164		
Chloro-bis(nitrato-O,O')-bis(tetramethyl (t-butyl(hydroxy)methylene)-bis(phosphonate)-O,O')-neodymium(iii)	NdCl(NO_{3})_{2}{[(MeO)_{2}PO]_{2}C(OH)^{t}Bu}_{2}			monoclinic	P2_{1}/a	a 17.0961 b 9.3040 c 24.4989 β 110.244°				
tri-sodium hexakis(μ-oxo)-tetraoctacontakis(μ-hydroxo)-triacontakis(μ-2-thiophenecarboxylato)-tetrakis(2-thiophenecarboxylato)-decakis(μ-glycinato)-diglycine-docosa-aqua-octatetraconta-europium(iii) nitrate hexachloride 2-thiophenecarboxylic acid pentahydrate	Na_{3}[Eu_{48}O_{6}(OH)_{84}(tca)_{34}(gly)_{12}(H_{2}O)_{22}]·2Htca·6Cl·6H_{2}O·NO_{3}		15118.80	triclinic	P1̅	a 20.720 b 23.227 c 24.562 α 88.66° β 71.76° γ 63.57° Z=1	9960	2.500		
sodium tetradecakis(μ-3-hydroxy-2-(hydroxymethyl)-2-methylpropanoato)-hexakis(μ-oxo)-tetraoctacontakis(μ-hydroxo)-octadecakis(μ-2-thiophenecarboxylato)-octakis(2-thiophenecarboxylato)-tetracosa-aqua-octatetraconta-terbium(iii) nitrate octakis(chloride)	Na[Tb_{48}O_{6}(OH)_{84}(fca)_{26}(dmp)_{14}(H_{2}O)_{24}]·4Hfca·NO_{3}·8Cl		15154.02	monoclinic	P2_{1}/n	a 24.0145 b 32.9221 c 25.6605 β 97.521° Z=2	20112.9	2.490		
L=2-methyl-8-hydroxyquinoline tetrakis(μ-2-methylquinolin-8-olato)-(μ-chloro)-ethanol-dinitrato-di-nickel(ii)-dysprosium(iii) acetonitrile solvate	[Ni_{2}^{II}Dy^{III}(EtOH)(L^{2})_{4}(NO_{3})_{2}Cl] ⋅ CH_{3}CN			triclinic	P1̅	a 11.1201 b 14.1566 c 15.448 α 78.625° β 73.918° γ 81.055°				
(tetrakis(μ-(1-phenylethyl)ammoniomethylphosphonato)-chloro-nitrato-di-erbium	R- or S-[Er_{2}(pempH)_{4}(NO_{3})Cl]			orthorhombic	P2_{1}2_{1}2	a 15.986 b 32.069 c 9.1593			quadruple stranded helix	
	[{trans-PtCl(NH_{3})_{2}}{μ-(H_{2}N(CH_{2})_{6}NH_{2})}{trans-PdCl(NH_{3})_{2}](NO_{3})Cl								yellow	
	[{trans-PtCl(NH_{3})_{2}}2{trans-Pt(thiazole)_{2}}{H_{2}N(CH2)_{6}NH_{2}}_{2}]Cl_{3}(NO_{3})									
	[PtPy_{2}(NH=CH-OH)Cl_{3}]NO_{3}			orthorhombic	P2_{1}2_{1}2_{1}	a = 10.381 b = 11.776 c = 13.848 Z = 4	1692.9			
alpha pyridone	cis-[Pt(NH_{3})_{2}(C_{5}H_{4}NOH)Cl](NO_{3})			triclinic	P1̅	a=10.706 b=12.552 c=4.151 α =95.57° β=92.32° γ=99.05° Z=2	547.4	2.558	white needles	
[Pt^{IV}(trans-1R,2R-diaminocyclohexane)trans-(acetate)_{2}(9-ethylguanine)Cl]NO_{3} · H_{2}O					P2_{1}	a = 10.446 b = 22.906 c = 10.978 Z = 4				
Chloro-(homopiperazine)-(diphenylsulfido)-platinum(ii) nitrate	[Pt^{II}(homopiperazine)(diphenylsulfide)Cl]NO_{3}			monoclinic	P2_{1}/c	a 17.666 b 8.812 c 12.619 β 101.02°				
mmap=1-methyl-4-(methylamino)piperidine	[Pt(mmap)(CH_{3})_{2}S)Cl](NO_{3})								white	
dhq=decahydroquinoline	[Pt(dhq)(CH_{3})_{2}S)Cl](NO_{3})									
	[La(NO_{3})_{2}(H_{2}O)_{6}]_{2}[PtCl_{6}]·2H_{2}O			monoclinic	P2_{1}/c	a = 6.974 b = 16.545 c = 13.177 β = 93.97° Z=2			yellow	
	[Pr(NO_{3})_{2}(H_{2}O)_{6}]_{2}[PtCl_{6}]·2H_{2}O			monoclinic	P2_{1}/c	a = 6.955 b = 16.525, c = 13.18.5 β = 93.93° Z=2			yellow	
	[Gd(NO_{3})(H_{2}O)_{7}][PtCl_{6}]·4H_{2}O			monoclinic	P2_{1}/n	a = 8.3872 b = 21.3198 c = 11.4263 β = 95.670° Z=4			yellow	
	[Dy(NO_{3})(H_{2}O)_{7}][PtCl_{6}]·4H_{2}O			monoclinic	P2_{1}/n	a = 8.3840 b = 21.3950 c = 11.4310 β = 95.698° Z=4			yellow	
	Ir[NO_{3}]_{2}Cl[NH_{3}]_{5}			tetragonal	I4	a = 7.6061 c = 10.4039	601.89	2.410	yellow	
	{Cp*_{2}Ir_{2}[Ni(pyterpy)_{2}]Cl_{4}}(NO_{3})_{2}									
Dichloro(ethylenediamine)gold(III) nitrate	[Au(NH_{2}CH_{2}CH_{2}NH_{2})Cl_{2}]NO_{3}			orthorhombic	Pbca	a = 10.338 b = 8.2105 c = 19.625 Z=8				
(2,2'-Bipyridine)dichlorogold(III) nitrate	[AuCl_{2}(C_{10}H_{8}N_{2})]NO_{3}		486.06	monoclinic	C2/c	a 6.9240 b 14.0460 c 13.0560 β 96.562° Z=4	1261.44	2.559	pale yellow	
Bis(methy1 L-cysteineato)mercury(II) hydrochloride hydronitrate monohydrate	(C_{4}H_{9}NO_{2}S)_{2}ClHgNO_{3}•H_{2}O									
chloronitrato-2-{2′-[(1′-methyl)benzimidazolyl]}- 4,4,5,5-tetramethylimidazoline-1-oxyl-3-oxidemercury(II) – mercury(II)chloride	HgCl(NO_{3})(C_{15}H_{19}N_{4}O_{2}) · HgCl_{2}			triclinic	P1̅	a=9.922 b=10.822 c=11.460 α=107.518° β=102.046° γ=96.639° Z=2	1126.5		black	
caesium mercuric nitrate chloride	CsHgNO_{3}Cl_{2}	1:2	466.41	hexagonal	P6_{3}/mmc	a=5.8817 c=11.3920 Z=2	341.30	4.538	birefringent Δn = 0.145@546 nm	
	KBiCl_{3}NO_{3}			monoclinic	P2_{1}/c					
4-chloropyridinium	(C_{5}H_{5}NCl)_{2}[UO_{2}Cl_{3}(NO_{3})]	1:3		triclinic	P1̅	a=6.819 b=10.781 c=14.252 α=72.890° β=80.394° γ=74.456° Z=2	960.3	2.308		
4-bromopyridinium	(C_{5}H_{5}NBr)_{2}[UO_{2}Cl_{3}(NO_{3})]	1:3	756.41	monoclinic	P2_{1}/m	a =9.739 b =16.484 c =12.950 β =102.360° Z=4	2030.8	2.474		
4-iodopyridinium	(C_{5}H_{5}NI)_{3}[UO_{2}Cl_{3}(NO_{3})](NO_{3})	2:3	559.20*2	monoclinic	P2_{1}/c	a =7.9797 b =25.043 c =14.730 β =103.019° Z=4	2868.0	2.590		
pyr_{2}phen = N,N′-bis-(pyridoxylideneiminato)^{2−}phenylene (N-(3-Hydroxy-5-(hydroxymethyl)-2-methylpyridin-4-ylmethylidene)-N'-(5-(hydroxymethyl)-2-methyl-3-oxypyridin-4-ylmethylidene)-o-phenylenediamine-N,N',O,O')-chloro-dioxo-uranium nitrate dihydrate	[UO_{2}(H_{2}pyr_{2}phen)Cl]NO_{3}			triclinic	P1̅	a 9.231 b 11.855 c 14.026 α 114.8° β 94.012° γ 97.95°				
	K_{3}[(UO_{2})(NO_{3})Cl_{3}](NO_{3})			monoclinic	P2_{1}	a 7.8596 b 15.8675 c 10.6823 β 90.141° Z=4	1332.21	3.08		
	Cs_{2}(UO_{2})(NO_{3})Cl_{3}	1:3	704.21	monoclinic	P2_{1}/n	a=10.375 b=9.468 c=12.553 β= 110.280 Z=4	1156.7	4.04	lemon yellow	
bis(4-iodo-pyridinium) dinitrato-tetrachloro-plutonium(iv)	(C_{5}H_{5}NI)_{2}[Pu(IV)Cl_{4}(NO_{3})_{2}]			triclinic	P1̅	a =9.8096 b=10.1402 c=11.5033 73.416 82.364 87.100 Z=2	1086.8	2.811	orange	
bis(pyridinium) trinitrato-trichloro-plutonium(iv)	(C_{5}H_{6}N)_{2}[Pu(IV)Cl_{3}(NO_{3})_{3}]		694.60	monoclinic	P2_{1}/c	a 17.268 b 7.7622 c 15.112 β 97.598° Z=4	2007.8	2.298	dark red	
bis(4-chloro-pyridinium) dioxo-trichloro-nitrato-plutonium(vi)	(C_{5}H_{5}NCl)_{2}[Pu(VI)O_{2}Cl_{3}(NO_{3})]		671.46	triclinic	P1̅	a 6.7493 b 10.8107 c 14.171 α 73.657° β 81.412° γ 75.206° Z=2	956.0	2.333	yellow	
