= Methyl phenyl sulfoxide =

Names
- Preferred IUPAC name (Methanesulfinyl)benzene
- Other names Methylsulfinylbenzene

Identifiers
| CAS Number | 1193-82-4; 4850-71-9 (R); 18453-46-8 (S) |
| 3D model (JSmol) | Interactive image |
| ChEBI | CHEBI:134307 |
| ChEMBL | ChEMBL326279 |
| ChemSpider | 13860 |
| ECHA InfoCard | 100.013.438 |
| EC Number | 214-781-2 |
| PubChem CID | 14516 |
| CompTox Dashboard (EPA) | DTXSID40870860 |
- InChI: InChI=1S/C7H8OS/c1-9(8)7-5-3-2-4-6-7/h2-6H,1H3 Key: JXTGICXCHWMCPM-UHFFFAOYSA-N
- SMILES: CS(=O)C1=CC=CC=C1

Properties
| Chemical formula | C_{7}H_{8}OS |
| Molar mass | 140.20 g·mol^{−1} |
| Appearance | colorless or white solid |
| Density | 1.19±0.1 g/cm^{3} |
| Melting point | 32 °C (90 °F; 305 K) |
| Boiling point | 263.5 °C (506.3 °F; 536.6 K) |

Hazards
- GHS labelling
| Pictograms | (GHS05: Corrosive) (GHS07: Exclamation mark) |
| Signal word | Warning |
| Hazard statements | H315, H318, H335 |
| Precautionary statements | P261, P264, P271, P280, P302+P352, P304+P340, P305+P351+P338, P310, P312, P321, P332+P313, P362, P403+P233, P405, P501 |
- Except where otherwise noted, data are given for materials in their standard state (at 25 °C [77 °F], 100 kPa). Infobox references

Methyl phenyl sulfoxide is the organosulfur compound with the formula CH_{3}S(O)C_{6}H_{5}. A low-melting white solid, it is an oxidized derivative of thioanisole. The compound is a prototypical chiral sulfoxide. As such it has been prepared by asymmetric oxidation.
