= Organic sulfide =

Organic compound with an –S– group

General structure of a sulfide with the blue marked functional group.

In organic chemistry, a sulfide (British English sulphide) or thioether is an organosulfur functional group with the connectivity R−S−R' as shown on right. Like many other sulfur-containing compounds, volatile sulfides have foul odors. A sulfide is similar to an ether except that it contains a sulfur atom in place of the oxygen. The grouping of oxygen and sulfur in the periodic table suggests that the chemical properties of ethers and sulfides are somewhat similar, though the extent to which this is true in practice varies depending on the application.

== Nomenclature ==
Sulfides are sometimes called thioethers, especially in the old literature. The two organic substituents are indicated by the prefixes. (CH_{3})_{2}S is called dimethylsulfide. Some sulfides are named by modifying the common name for the corresponding ether. For example, C_{6}H_{5}SCH_{3} is methyl phenyl sulfide, but is more commonly called thioanisole, since its structure is related to that for anisole, C_{6}H_{5}OCH_{3}.

The modern systematic nomenclature in chemistry for the trival name thioether is sulfane.

== Structure and properties ==
Sulfide is an angular functional group, the C–S–C angle approaching 90° The C–S bonds are about 180 pm. For the prototype, dimethylsulfide, the C-S-C angles is 99°, which is smaller than the C-O-C angle in ether (~110°). The C-S distance in dimethylsulfide is 1.81 Å.

Sulfides are characterized by their strong odors, which are similar to thiol odor. This odor limits the applications of volatile sulfides. In terms of their physical properties they resemble ethers, but are less volatile, higher melting, and less hydrophilic. These properties follow from the polarizability of the divalent sulfur center, which is greater than that for oxygen in ethers.

=== Thiophenes ===
Thiophenes are a special class of sulfide-containing heterocyclic compounds. The nonbonding electrons on sulfur are delocalized into the aromatic π-system. As a consequence, thiophene exhibits few properties expected for a sulfide – thiophene is non-nucleophilic at sulfur and, in fact, is sweet-smelling. Upon hydrogenation, thiophene gives tetrahydrothiophene, C_{4}H_{8}S, which indeed does behave as a typical sulfide.

== Occurrence and applications ==
Sulfides are important in biology, notably in the amino acid methionine and the cofactor biotin. Petroleum contains many organosulfur compounds, including sulfides. Polyphenylene sulfide is a useful high temperature plastic. Coenzyme M, CH_{3}SCH_{2}CH_{2}SO^{−}_{3}, is the precursor to methane (i.e. natural gas) via the process of methanogenesis.

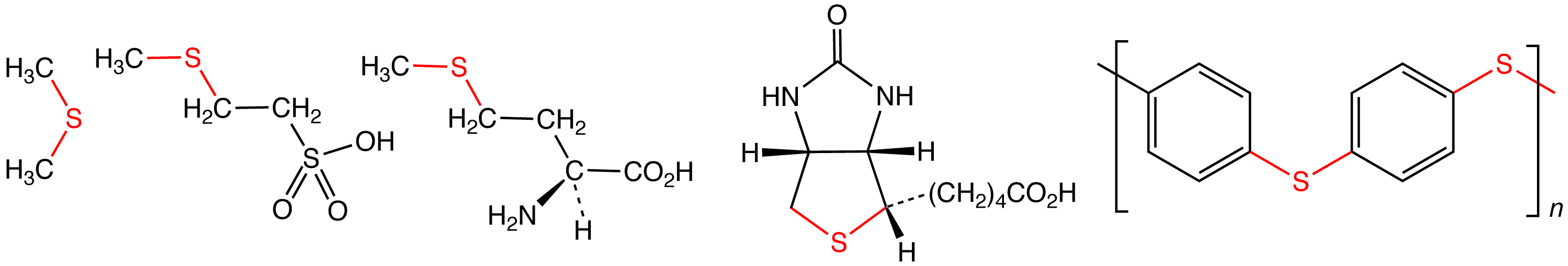
Selected thioethers, from left: dimethylsulfide, coenzyme-M, the amino acid methionine, the vitamin biotin, and the engineering plastic polyphenylene sulfide.

== Preparation ==
Sulfides are typically prepared by alkylation of thiols. Alkylating agents include not only alkyl halides, but also epoxides, aziridines, and Michael acceptors.

RBr + HSR' → RSR' + HBr

Such reactions are usually conducted in the presence of a base, which converts the thiol into the more nucleophilic thiolate. Analogously, the reaction of disulfides with organolithium reagents produces thioethers:

R^{3}CLi + R^{1}S-SR^{2} → R^{3}CSR^{1} + R^{2}SLi

Analogous reactions are known starting with Grignard reagents.

Alternatively, sulfides can be synthesized by the addition of a thiol to an alkene in the thiol-ene reaction:

R-CH=CH_{2} + H-SR' → R-CH_{2}-CH_{2}-S-R'

This reaction is often catalysed by free radicals produced from a photoinitiator.

Sulfides can also be prepared by many other methods, such as the Pummerer rearrangement. Trialkysulfonium salts react with nucleophiles with a dialkyl sulfide as a leaving group:

Nu^{−} + R^{3}S^{+} → Nu-R + R^{2}SR^{1}

This reaction is exploited in biological systems as a means of transferring an alkyl group. For example, S-adenosylmethionine acts as a methylating agent in biological S_{N}2 reactions.

An unusual but well tested method for the synthesis of thioethers involves addition of alkenes, especially ethylene across the S-Cl bond of sulfur dichloride. This method has been used in the production of bis(2-chloroethyl)sulfide, a mustard gas:

SCl_{2} + 2 C_{2}H_{4} → (ClC_{2}H_{4})_{2}S

== Reactions ==
The Lewis basic lone pairs on sulfur dominate the sulfides' reactivity. Sulfides readily alkylate to stable sulfonium salts, such as trimethylsulfonium iodide:

S(CH_{3})_{2} + CH_{3}I → [S(CH_{3})_{3}]^{+}I^{−}

Sulfides also oxidize easily to sulfoxides (R−S(=O)−R), which can themselves be further oxidized to sulfones (R−S(=O)_{2}−R). Hydrogen peroxide is a typical oxidant—for example, with dimethyl sulfide (S(CH_{3})_{2}):

S(CH_{3})_{2} + H_{2}O_{2} → OS(CH_{3})_{2} + H_{2}O
OS(CH_{3})_{2} + H_{2}O_{2} → O_{2}S(CH_{3})_{2} + H_{2}O

In analogy to their easy alkylation, sulfides bind to metals to form thioether complexes. Consequently, Lewis acids do not decompose thioethers as they do ethers. Sulfides are soft ligands, but their affinity for metals is lower than typical phosphines. Chelating thioethers are known, such as 1,4,7-trithiacyclononane.

Sulfides undergo hydrogenolysis in the presence of certain metals:

R-S-R' + 2 H_{2} → RH + R'H + H_{2}S

Raney nickel is useful for stoichiometric reactions in organic synthesis whereas molybdenum-based catalysts are used to "sweeten" petroleum fractions, in the process called hydrodesulfurization. Similarly dissolving metal reductions can induce dealkylation or dearylation.

The protons adjacent to the sulfur atom are labile, and can be deprotonated with strong bases.
