= Dichlorotetrakis(dimethylsulfoxide)ruthenium(II) =

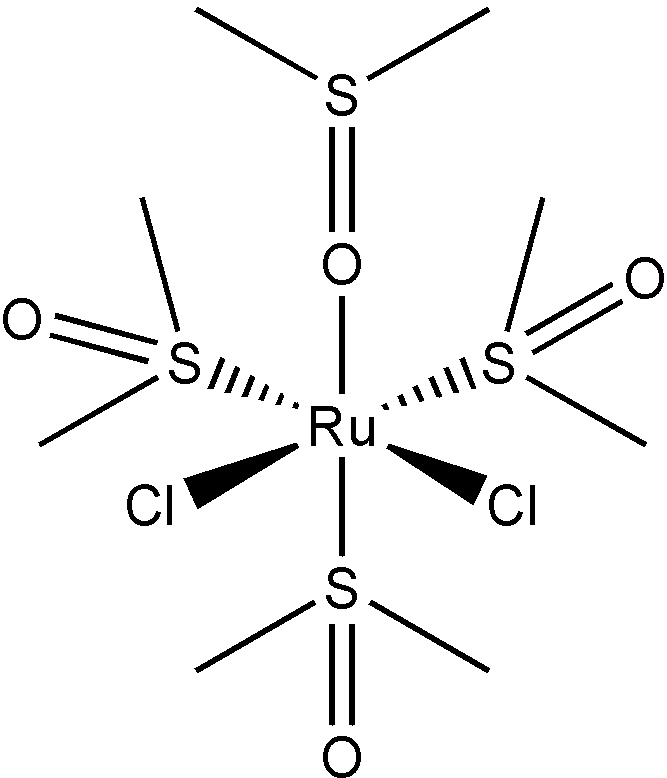

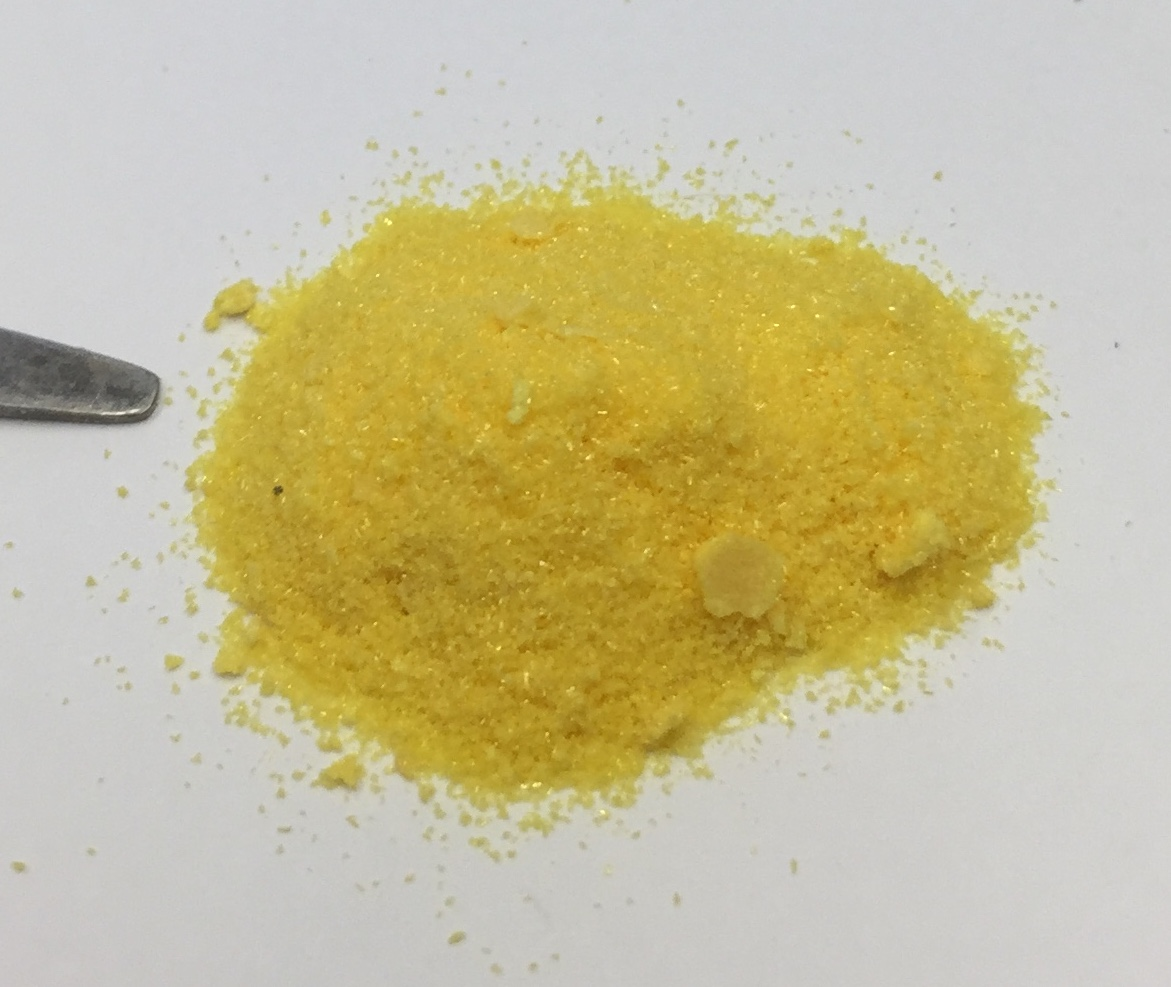

Names
- Other names Tetrakis(dimethylsulfoxide)dichlororuthenium(II)

Identifiers
CAS Number	11070-19-2
3D model (JSmol)	cis isomer: Interactive image; trans isomer: Interactive image
ChemSpider	132402
PubChem CID	150194
CompTox Dashboard (EPA)	DTXSID20149364
- InChI: InChI=1S/4C2H6OS.2ClH.Ru/c4*1-4(2)3;;;/h4*1-2H3;2*1H;/q;;;;;;+2/p-2 Key: UMJDEUKQHKMAOI-UHFFFAOYSA-L
- SMILES: cis isomer: Cl[Ru-4]([S+2](C)(C)[O-])(O[S+](C)C)([S+2](C)(C)[O-])([S+2](C)(C)[O-])Cl; trans isomer: Cl[Ru-4](Cl)([S+2](C)(C)[O-])([S+2](C)(C)[O-])([S+2](C)(C)[O-])[S+2](C)(C)[O-]

Properties
Chemical formula	C_{8}H_{24}Cl_{2}O_{4}RuS_{4}
Molar mass	484.51 g/mol
Appearance	Various shades of yellow crystals
Solubility in water	Miscible in water
Solubility	Nitromethane, chloroform, dichloromethane

Structure
Coordination geometry	Octahedral coordinate

Hazards
- GHS labelling
Pictograms	(GHS07: Exclamation mark)
Signal word	Warning
Hazard statements	H315, H319, H335
Precautionary statements	P261, P264, P264+P265, P271, P280, P302+P352, P304+P340, P305+P351+P338, P319, P321, P332+P317, P337+P317, P362+P364, P403+P233, P405, P501
- Except where otherwise noted, data are given for materials in their standard state (at 25 °C [77 °F], 100 kPa). verify (what is ?) Infobox references

Dichlorotetrakis(dimethyl sulfoxide) ruthenium(II) describes coordination compounds with the formula RuCl_{2}(dmso)_{4}, where DMSO is dimethylsulfoxide. Both cis and trans isomers are known, but the cis isomer is more common. The cis isomer is a yellow, air-stable solid that is soluble in some organic solvents. These sulfoxide complexes are used in the synthesis of various ruthenium(II) complexes. They have also attracted attention as possible anti-cancer drugs.

== Structure and synthesis ==
The cis isomer illustrates linkage isomerism for the DMSO ligand. One of the two dmso ligands that are cis to both chloride ligands is O-bonded while the other three dmso ligands are S-bonded. In the trans isomer, which is also yellow, all four dmso ligands are S-bonded. The cis isomer is formed thermally, and the trans isomer is obtained by UV-irradiation of the cis isomer.

cis isomer	trans isomer

The complexes were first prepared in 1971 by heating DMSO solutions of ruthenium trichloride under hydrogen atmosphere. Modern procedures has been developed which avoids hydrogen gas, either using ascorbic acid or refluxing DMSO to reduce the ruthenium.

== Potential applications ==
RuCl_{2}(dmso)_{4} was identified as a potential anticancer agent in the early 1980s. Continued research has led to the development of several related dmso-containing ruthenium compounds, some of which have undergone early-stage clinical trials.
