= Linkage isomerism =

Coordination compounds of the same composition but differing connectivity to ligands

In chemistry, linkage isomerism or ambidentate isomerism is a form of structural isomerism in which certain coordination complexes have the same composition but differ in which atom of the ligand is bonded to the metal.

Typical ligands that give rise to linkage isomers are:

- cyanide, CN^{−} – isocyanide, NC^{−}
- cyanate, OCN^{−} – isocyanate, NCO^{−}
- thiocyanate, SCN^{−} – isothiocyanate, NCS^{−}
- selenocyanate, SeCN^{−} – isoselenocyanate, NCSe^{−}
- nitrite, NO^{−}_{2}
- sulfite, SO^{2−}_{3}

An example of chemicals that are linkage isomers is violet-colored [(NH_{3})_{5}Co-SCN]^{2+} and orange-colored [(NH_{3})_{5}Co-NCS]^{2+}. The isomerization of the S-bonded (isothiocyanate) isomer to the N-bonded (thiocyanate) isomer occurs by an intramolecular rearrangement.

The linkage isomers [Rh(SCN)_{6}]^{3−} and [Rh(SCN)_{5}(NCS)]^{3−} have been separated and individually characterized.

== History ==
Linkage isomerism was first noted for nitropentaamminecobalt(III), [Co(NH_{3})_{5}(NO_{2})]^{2+}. This cationic cobalt complex can be isolated as either of two linkage isomers. In the yellow-coloured isomer, the nitro ligand is bound through nitrogen. In the red linkage isomer, the nitrito is bound through one oxygen atom. The O-bonded isomer is often written as [Co(NH_{3})_{5}(ONO)]^{2+}. Although the existence of the isomers had been known since the late 1800s, only in 1907 was the difference explained. It was later shown that the red isomer converted to the yellow isomer upon UV-irradiation. In this particular example, the formation of the nitro isomer (Co-NO_{2}) from the nitrito isomer (Co-ONO) occurs by an intramolecular rearrangement.

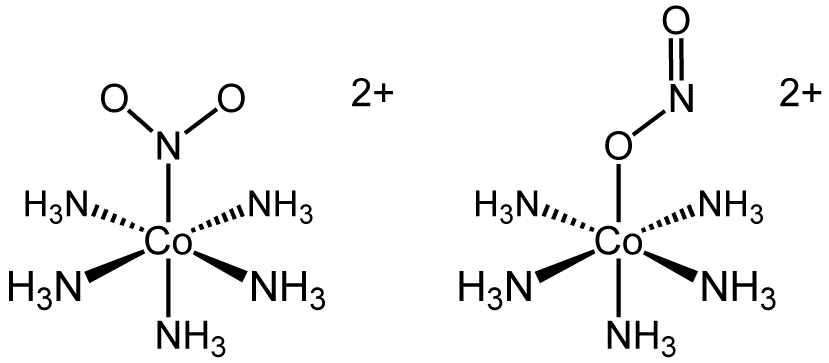
Structures of the two linkage isomers of [Co(NH_{3})_{5}(NO_{2})]^{2+}.

== Related phenomena ==
The complex cis-dichlorotetrakis(dimethylsulfoxide)ruthenium(II) (RuCl_{2}(dmso)_{4}) features both S- vs. O-bonded dimethylsulfoxide ligands.
