= Transition metal thioether complex =

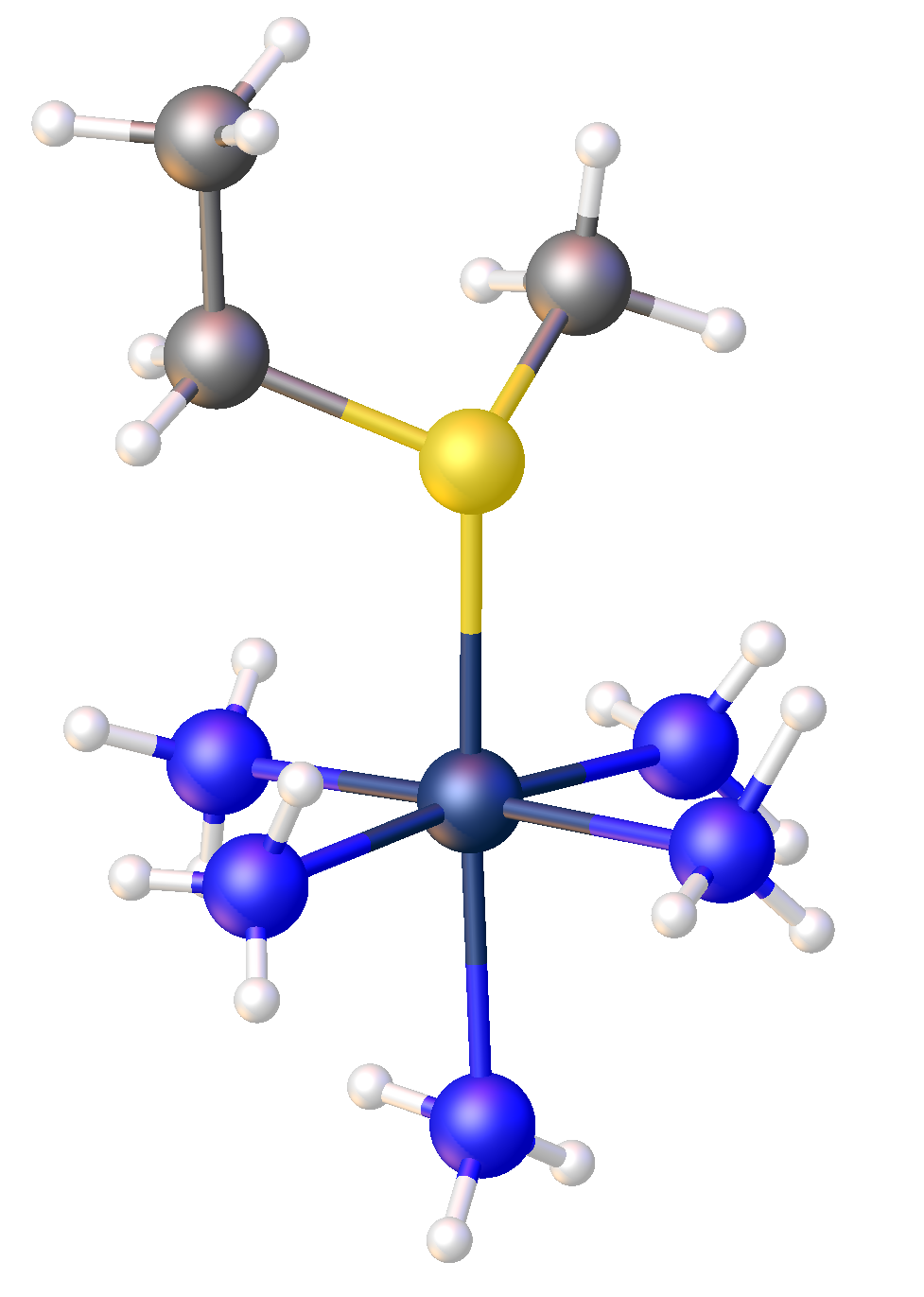
Structure of [Ru(NH_{3})_{5}(SMeEt)]^{2+}.

Transition metal thioether complexes comprise coordination complexes of thioether (R_{2}S) ligands. The inventory is extensive.

== Dimethylsulfide complexes ==
As the simplest thioether, dimethyl sulfide forms complexes that are illustrative of the class. Well characterized derivatives include cis-[TiCl_{4}L_{2}], VCl_{3}L_{2}, NbCl_{5}L, NbCl_{4}L_{2}, Cr(CO)_{5}L, CrCl_{3}L_{3}, RuCl_{2}L_{4}, RuCl_{3}L_{3}, RhCl_{3}L_{3}, cis- and trans-[IrCl_{4}L_{3}]^{−}, cis-MCl_{2}L_{2} (M = Pd, Pt), [PtCl_{3}L]^{−}, cis- and trans-[PtCl_{4}L_{2}] (L = SMe_{2}). With respect to donor properties, dimethyl sulfide is a soft ligand with donor properties weaker than phosphine ligands. Such complexes are generally prepared by treating the metal halide with the thioether. Chloro(dimethyl sulfide)gold(I) can however be prepared by redox reaction of elemental gold and DMSO in the presence of hydrochloric acid.

== Stereochemistry ==
Diastereotopic methylene protons in complexes of diethyl sulfide.

Thioether complexes feature pyramidal sulfur centers. Typical C-S-C angles are near 99° in both free thioethers and their complexes. The C-S distance in dimethylsulfide is 1.81 Å, which is also unaffected in its complexes. The stereochemistry of thioether complexes have been extensively studied. Unsymmetrical thioethers, e.g., SMeEt, are prochiral ligands, and their complexes are chiral. One example is [Ru(NH_{3})_{5}(SMeEt)]^{2+}. The complex cis-VOCl_{2}(SMeEt)_{2} exists as meso- and a pair of enantiomers. In complexes of thioethers of the type S(CH_{2}R)_{2} (R ≠ H), the methylene protons are diastereotopic. Examination of the NMR spectra of such complexes reveal that they undergo inversion at sulfur, without dissociation of the M-S bond.

== Thioether as a bridging ligand ==
Structure of Nb_{2}Cl_{6}(SMe_{2})_{3}, illustrating a bridging thioether.

Unlike ethers, thioethers occasionally serve as bridging ligands. The complexes Nb_{2}Cl_{6}(SMe_{2})_{3} is one such example. It adopts a face-sharing bioctahedral structure with a Nb(III)=Nb(III) bond, spanned by two chloride and one dimethylsulfide ligands. The complex Pt_{2}Me_{4}(μ-SMe_{2})_{2} is a source of "PtMe_{2}".

== Complexes chelating thioether ligands ==
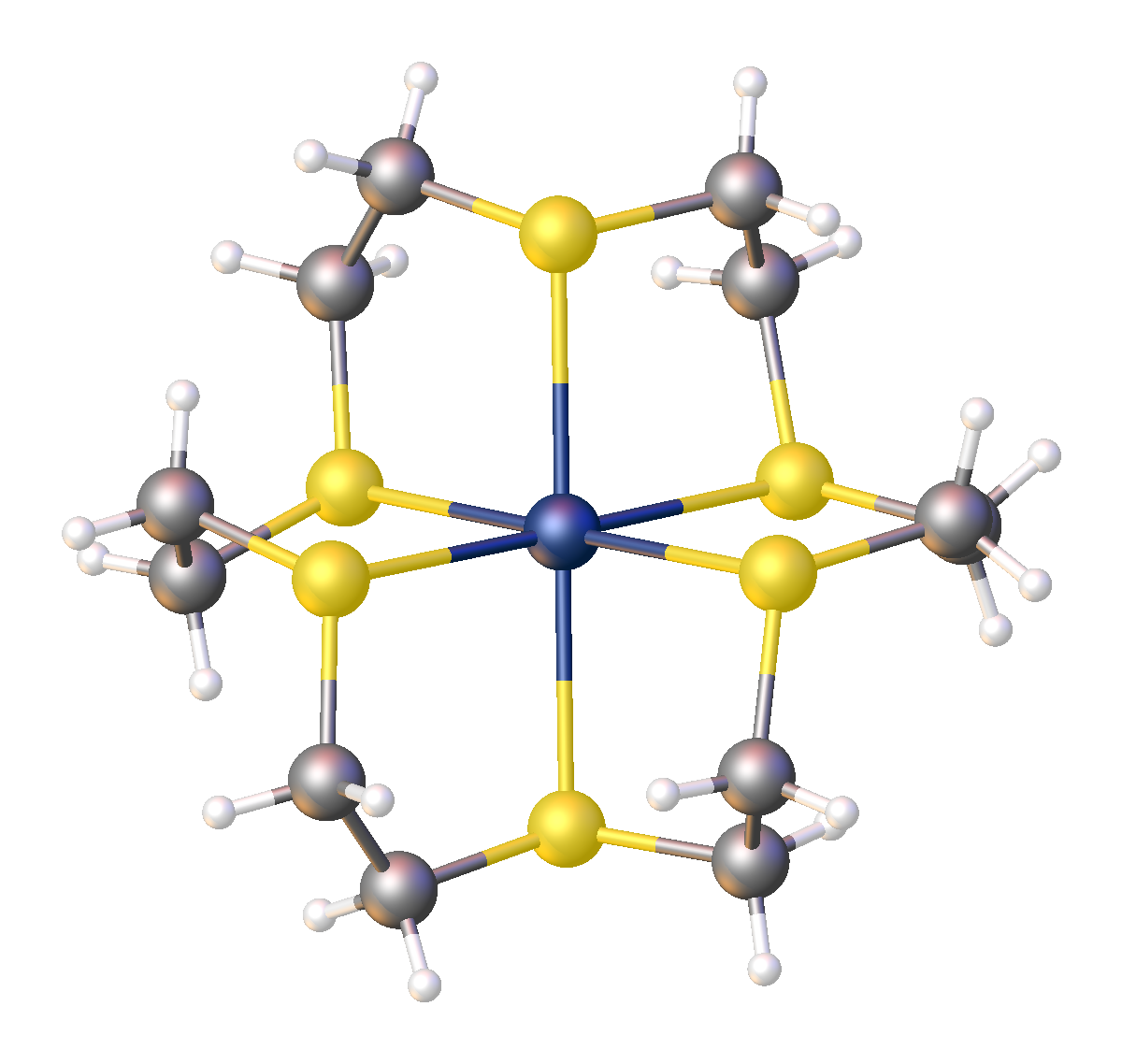
Structure of [Ag(18-ane-S6)]^{2+}. The Ag-S distances are 2.62 Å.

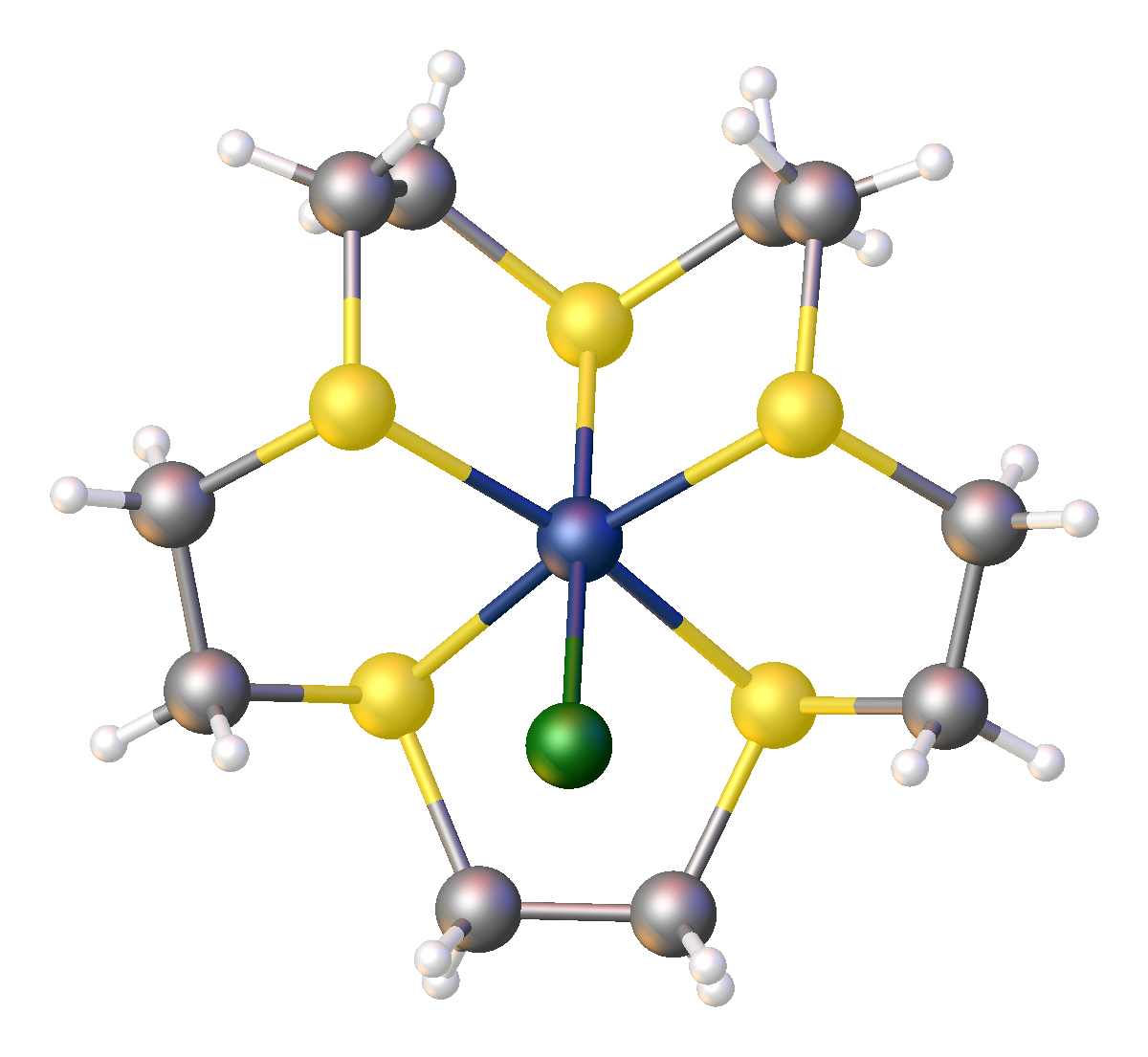
Structure of [Ru(15-ane-S5)Cl]^{+}.

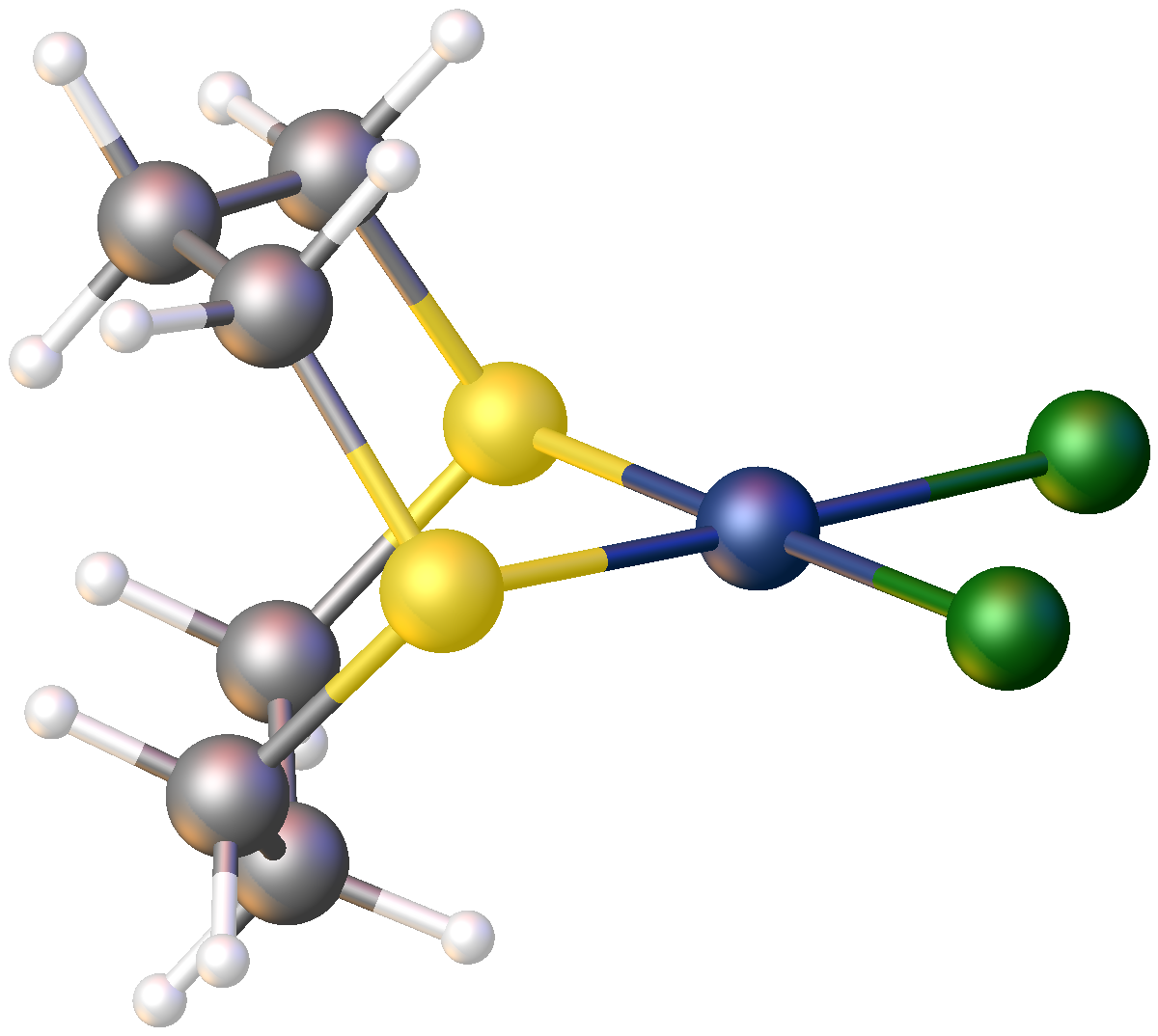
Structure of (DTCO)PdCl_{2}.

Thiacrown ligands are analogous to crown ethers. The best studied thiacrown ligands have the formula (SCH_{2}CH_{2})_{n} (n = 3,4,5,6). The tridentate tri-thioether 9-ane-S3 forms extensive families of complexes of the type M(9-ane-S3)L_{3} and [M(9-ane-S3)_{2}]^{2+}. Examples of Cu(II)-thioether complexes were prepared from 14-ane-S4 and 15-ane-S5. The hexadentate ligand 18-ane-6 also forms extensive family of complexes, including unusual examples of Pd(III) and Ag(II). Examples of homoleptic complexes [M(SR_{2})_{6}]^{n+} are otherwise rare.

== Occurrence ==
Thioether complexes in nature arise from coordination of the sulfur substituent found in the amino acid methionine. One of the axial ligands in cytochrome c is illustrative. Methionine sulfur weakly binds to copper in azurin.

== Related ligands: sulfonium ==
Trimethylsulfonium, the methylated derivative of dimethylsulfide, is isoelectronic with trimethylphosphine. It forms complexes such as [Ru(NH_{3})_{5}(S(CH_{3})_{3}]^{3+}.
