= Thioanisole =

Names
- Preferred IUPAC name (Methylsulfanyl)benzene
- Other names Thioanisole; Methyl(phenyl)sulfane; Phenyl methyl sulfide Methylthiobenzene

Identifiers
CAS Number	100-68-5
3D model (JSmol)	Interactive image
ChemSpider	7239
ECHA InfoCard	100.002.617
EC Number	202-878-2
PubChem CID	7520
UNII	BB4K737YF4
CompTox Dashboard (EPA)	DTXSID8059217
- InChI: InChI=1S/C7H8S/c1-8-7-5-3-2-4-6-7/h2-6H,1H3 Key: HNKJADCVZUBCPG-UHFFFAOYSA-N; InChI=1/C7H8S/c1-8-7-5-3-2-4-6-7/h2-6H,1H3 Key: HNKJADCVZUBCPG-UHFFFAOYAJ
- SMILES: CSC1=CC=CC=C1

Properties
Chemical formula	C_{7}H_{8}S
Molar mass	124.20 g·mol^{−1}
Appearance	colorless liquid
Density	1.0533 g/cm^{3}
Melting point	−15 °C (5 °F; 258 K)
Boiling point	193 °C (379 °F; 466 K)
- Except where otherwise noted, data are given for materials in their standard state (at 25 °C [77 °F], 100 kPa). Infobox references

Thioanisole is an organic compound with the formula CH_{3}SC_{6}H_{5}. It is a colorless liquid that is soluble in organic solvents. It is the simplest alkyl–aryl thioether. The name indicates that this compound is the sulfur analogue—the thioether rather than the oxygen-centered ether—of anisole.

It can be prepared by methylation of thiophenol.

== Reactions ==
Alkyllithium reagents deprotonate thioanisole at the methyl group to afford C_{6}H_{5}SCH_{2}Li, a strong nucleophile that can be alkylated to form more complex chains and structures. The resulting homologated thioether can be manipulated in a variety of ways.

Oxidation of sulfur via addition of a single oxygen atom gives methyl phenyl sulfoxide, a reaction useful for titration of oxidants such as dimethyldioxirane. Successive oxidation then leads to the sulfone.
