= Trimethylsulfonium =

Ion

Names
- IUPAC name Trimethylsulfonium
- Systematic IUPAC name Trimethylsulfanium
- Other names: Trimesium; Trimethylsulfur(1+)

Identifiers
CAS Number	676-84-6
3D model (JSmol)	Interactive image
ChemSpider	1115
PubChem CID	1147
UNII	8U5M0SJV65
CompTox Dashboard (EPA)	DTXSID50862857
- InChI: InChI=1S/C3H9S/c1-4(2)3/h1-3H3/q+1 Key: NRZWQKGABZFFKE-UHFFFAOYSA-N
- SMILES: C[S+](C)C

Properties
Chemical formula	(CH_{3})_{3}S^{+}
Molar mass	77.17 g·mol^{−1}
- Except where otherwise noted, data are given for materials in their standard state (at 25 °C [77 °F], 100 kPa). Infobox references

Trimethylsulfonium (systematically named trimethylsulfanium) is an organic cation with the chemical formula (CH_{3})_{3}S^{+} (also written as C_{3}H_{9}S^{+}).

== Compounds ==
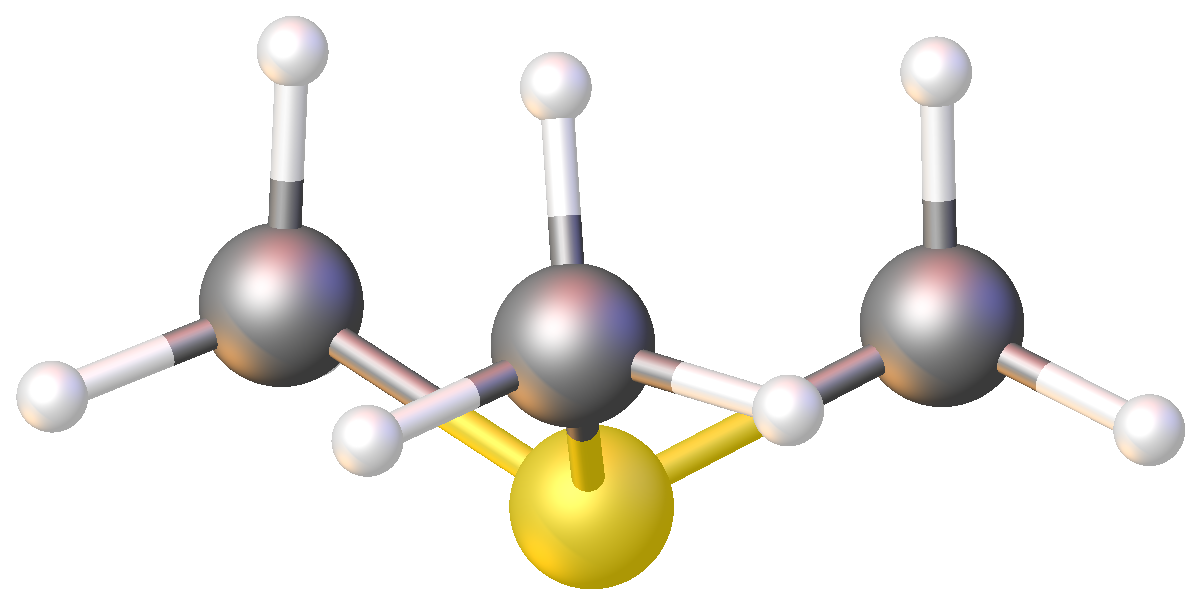
Structure of (CH_{3})_{3}S^{+} in its tetraphenylborate salt.

Several salts of trimethylsulfonium are known. X-ray crystallography reveals that the ion has trigonal pyramidal molecular geometry at sulfur atom, with C-S-C angles near 102° and C-S bond distance of 177 picometers. Unless the counteranion is colored, all trimethylsulfonium salts are white or colorless.

Salt	Formula	Molecular weight (g/mol)	Properties
Trimethylsulfonium chloride	[(CH_{3})_{3}S]^{+}Cl^{−}	112.5	Colorless crystals, decompose at 100 °C, very soluble in ethanol, very hygroscopic.
Trimethylsulfonium bromide	[(CH_{3})_{3}S]^{+}Br^{−}	157	Colorless crystals. Decomposes at 172 °C, melts in a sealed tube at 201-201 °C, reacts in neutral aqueous solution.
Trimethylsulfonium iodide	[(CH_{3})_{3}S]^{+}I^{−}	204	Colorless crystals, decomposes at 203-207 °C. crystal structure monoclinic, with these parameters: a = 5.94 μm, b = 8.00 μm, c = 8.92 μm, β = 126°32′ 2 formulas per unit cell, density = 1.958 g/cm^{3}
Trimethylsulfonium tetrafluoroborate	[(CH_{3})_{3}S]^{+}[BF_{4}]^{−}	163.97	white crystalline solid, melting point = 205-210 °C
Trimethylsulfonium methylsulfate	[(CH_{3})_{3}S]^{+}CH_{3}OSO^{−}_{3}	188.27	White solid, melting point = 92-94 °C Crystal structure orthorhombic with these parameters: a = 12.6157 μm, b = 8.2419 μm, c = 7.540 μm cell volume 784.0 2 formulas per unit cell

== Preparation ==
Sulfonium compounds can be synthesised by treating a suitable alkyl halide with a thioether. For example, the reaction of dimethyl sulfide with iodomethane yields trimethylsulfonium iodide:

(CH_{3})_{2}S + CH_{3}I → [(CH_{3})_{3}S]^{+}I^{−}

== Related ==
An extra oxygen atom can bond to the sulfur atom to yield the trimethylsulfoxonium ion [(CH_{3})_{3}S=O]^{+}, where the sulfur atom is tetravalent and tetracoordinated.

== Use ==
Glyphosate herbicide is often supplied as a trimethylsulfonium salt, referred to as trimesium.

When mixed with aluminium bromide, or aluminium chloride or even hydrogen bromide, trimethylsulfonium bromide forms an ionic liquid, which melts at temperatures below standard conditions.

== See also ==
- Onium compounds
