= Dieter Seebach =

German chemist (born 1937)

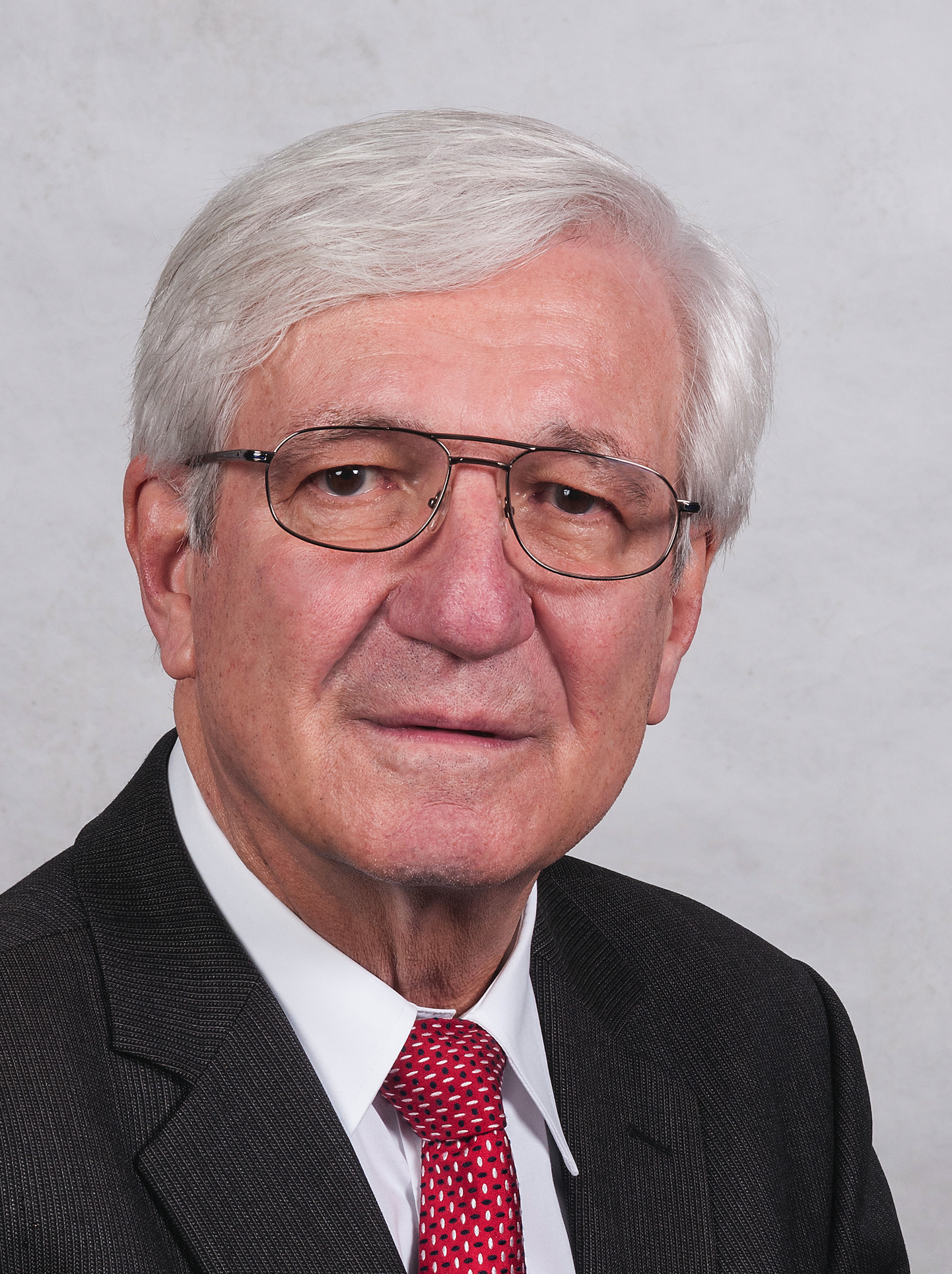
- Dieter Seebach
- Born: 31 October 1937 (age 88); Karlsruhe, Germany
- Education: University of Karlsruhe (TH); Harvard University
- Awards: Marcel Benoist Prize (2000); The Ryoji Noyori Prize (2004); Tetrahedron Prize (2003); Arthur C. Cope Award (2019)
- Scientific career
- Workplaces: University of Karlsruhe (TH); University of Giessen; ETH Zurich
- Doctoral advisor: Rudolf Criegee
- Doctoral students: Dieter Enders, Paul Knochel

Dieter Seebach is a German chemist known for his synthesis of biopolymers and dendrimers, and for his contributions to stereochemistry. He was born on 31 October 1937 in Karlsruhe. He studied chemistry at the University of Karlsruhe (TH) under the supervision of Rudolf Criegee and at Harvard University with Elias Corey finishing in 1969. After his habilitation he became professor for organic chemistry at the University of Giessen. After six years he was appointed professor at the ETH Zurich where he worked until he retired in 2003.

== Work ==
Seebach worked on dendrimer chemistry and on the synthesis of beta-peptides. The development of the umpolung, a polarity inversion of the carbonyl group, with 1,3-propanedithiol together with Corey had a big influence on organic synthesis, and subsequently the Corey-Seebach reaction was named after them.

The Fráter–Seebach alkylation, a diastereoselective reaction of beta-hydroxy esters, is named after him.

== Awards ==
- 2000 Marcel Benoist Prize
- 2003 Tetrahedron Prize for Creativity in Organic Chemistry & BioMedicinal Chemistry
- 2004 The Ryoji Noyori Prize
- 2019 Arthur C. Cope Award

== See also ==
- TADDOL
- DMPU
- Chiral column chromatography
- Corey-Seebach reaction
