= Umpolung =

Chemical process intended to reverse the polarity of a molecular functional group

In organic chemistry, umpolung (German: [ˈʔʊmˌpoːlʊŋ]) or polarity inversion is the chemical modification of a functional group with the aim of the reversal of polarity of that group. This modification allows secondary reactions of this functional group that would otherwise not be possible. The concept was introduced by German chemist Dieter Seebach (hence the German language derived name umpolung for reversed polarity) and E.J. Corey. Polarity analysis during retrosynthetic analysis tells a chemist when umpolung tactics are required to synthesize a target molecule.

== Introduction ==
The vast majority of important organic molecules contain heteroatoms, which polarize carbon skeletons by virtue of their electronegativity. Therefore, in standard organic reactions, the majority of new bonds are formed between atoms of opposite polarity. This can be considered to be the "normal" mode of reactivity.

One consequence of this natural polarization of molecules is that 1,3- and 1,5- heteroatom substituted carbon skeletons are extremely easy to synthesize (Aldol reaction, Claisen condensation, Michael reaction, Claisen rearrangement, Diels-Alder reaction), whereas 1,2-, 1,4-, and 1,6- heteroatom substitution patterns are more difficult to access via "normal" reactivity. It is therefore important to understand and develop methods to induce umpolung in organic reactions.

== Examples ==
The simplest method of obtaining 1,2-, 1,4-, and 1,6- heteroatom substitution patterns is to start with them. Biochemical and industrial processes can provide inexpensive sources of chemicals that have normally inaccessible substitution patterns. For example, amino acids, oxalic acid, succinic acid, adipic acid, tartaric acid, and glucose are abundant and provide nonroutine substitution patterns.

=== Cyanide-type umpolung ===
The canonical umpolung reagent is potassium cyanide as the cyanide ion is unusual in that a carbon triply bonded to a nitrogen would be expected to have a (+) polarity due to the higher electronegativity of the nitrogen atom. Yet, the negative charge of the cyanide ion is localized on the carbon, giving it a (-) formal charge. This chemical ambivalence results in umpolung in many reactions where cyanide ions are involved.

For example, cyanide is a key catalyst in the benzoin condensation, a classical example of polarity inversion.

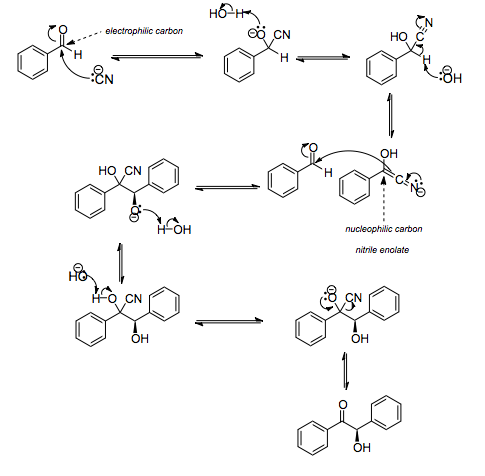
Mechanism of the benzoin condensation

The net result of the benzoin reaction is that a bond has been formed between two carbons that are normally electrophiles.

==== N-heterocyclic carbenes ====
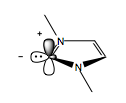

N-heterocyclic carbenes are similar to cyanide in reactivity. Like cyanide, they have an unusual electronic configuration, which allows them to trigger umpolung in reactions where they are involved. The carbene has six electrons - two each in the carbon-nitrogen single bonds, two in its sp^{2}-hybridized orbital, and an empty p-orbital. The sp^{2} lone pair acts as an electron donor, whereas the empty p-orbital is capable as acting as an electron acceptor.

In this example, the β-carbon of the α,β-unsaturated ester 1 formally acts as a nucleophile, whereas normally it would be expected to be a Michael acceptor.

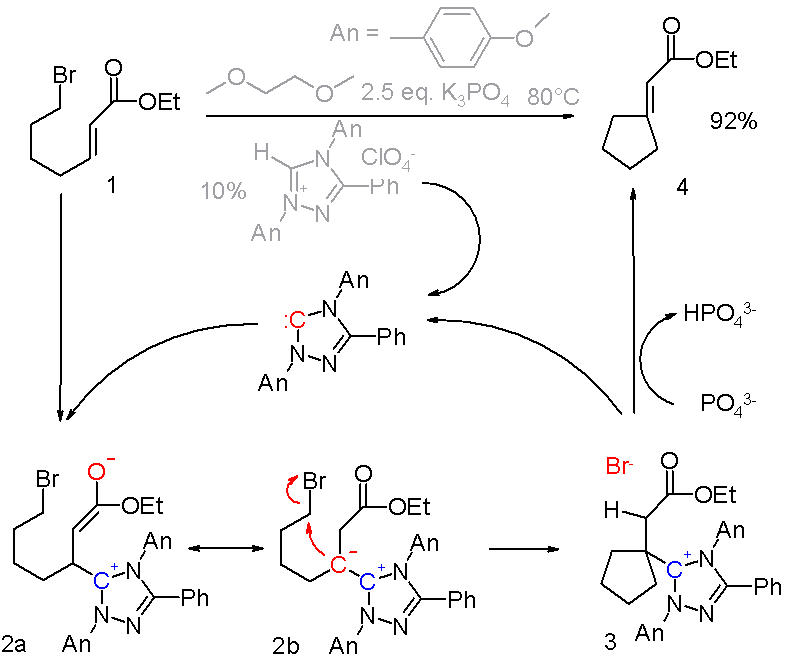
Scheme 3. Umpolung of Michael Acceptors

This carbene reacts with the α,β-unsaturated ester 1 at the β-position forming the intermediate enolate 2. Through tautomerization 2b can displace the terminal bromine atom to 3. An elimination reaction regenerates the carbene and releases the product 4.

For comparison: in the Baylis-Hillman reaction the same electrophilic β-carbon atom is attacked by a reagent but resulting in the activation of the α-position of the enone as the nucleophile.

==== Thiamine and thiamine pyrophosphate ====
Living organisms can employ cyanide-like umpolung reactivity without significant toxicity as the biochemical thiamine serves a functionally identical role. The thiazolium ring in the vitamin is deprotonated within the hydrophobic core of the enzyme, resulting in a persistent carbene which is capable of umpolung:

Deprotonation of thiazole moiety in thiamine pyrophosphate results in ambivalent chemical reactivity

Enzymes which use this chemistry can catalyze umpolung reactivity, such as the decarboxylation of pyruvate:

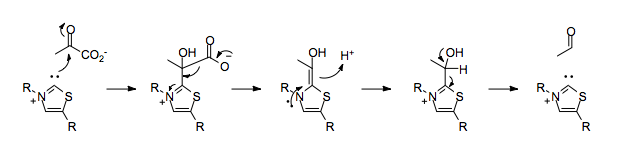
Mechanism of pyruvate decarboxylation

In the absence of the carbene, the decarboxylation of pyruvate would result in the placement of a negative charge on the carbonyl carbon, which would run counter to the normal polarization of the carbon-oxygen double bond.

=== 3-membered rings ===
Opening of ethylene oxide with hydroxide

3-membered rings are generally strained moieties in organic chemistry. When a 3-membered ring contains a heteroatom, such as in an epoxide or in a bromonium intermediate, the three atoms in the ring become polarized. It is impossible to assign (+) and (-) polarities to a 3-membered ring without having two adjacent atoms with the same polarity. Therefore, whenever a polarized 3-membered ring is opened by a nucleophile, umpolung inevitably results . For example, the opening of ethylene oxide with hydroxide leads to ethylene glycol.

=== Carbonyl umpolung / anion relay chemistry ===
Dithiane chemistry is a classic example of polarity inversion. This can be observed in the Corey-Seebach reaction.

Ordinarily the oxygen atom in the carbonyl group is more electronegative than the carbon atom and therefore the carbonyl group reacts as an electrophile at carbon. This polarity can be reversed when the carbonyl group is converted into a dithiane or a thioacetal. In synthon terminology the ordinary carbonyl group is an acyl cation and the dithiane is a masked acyl anion.

When the dithiane is derived from an aldehyde such as acetaldehyde the acyl proton can be abstracted by n-butyllithium in THF at low temperatures. The thus generated 2-lithio-1,3-dithiane reacts as a nucleophile in nucleophilic displacement with alkyl halides such as benzyl bromide, with other carbonyl compounds such as cyclohexanone or oxiranes such as phenyl-epoxyethane, shown below. After hydrolysis of the dithiane group the final reaction products are α-alkyl-ketones or α-hydroxy-ketones. A common reagent for dithiane hydrolysis is (bis(trifluoroacetoxy)iodo)benzene.

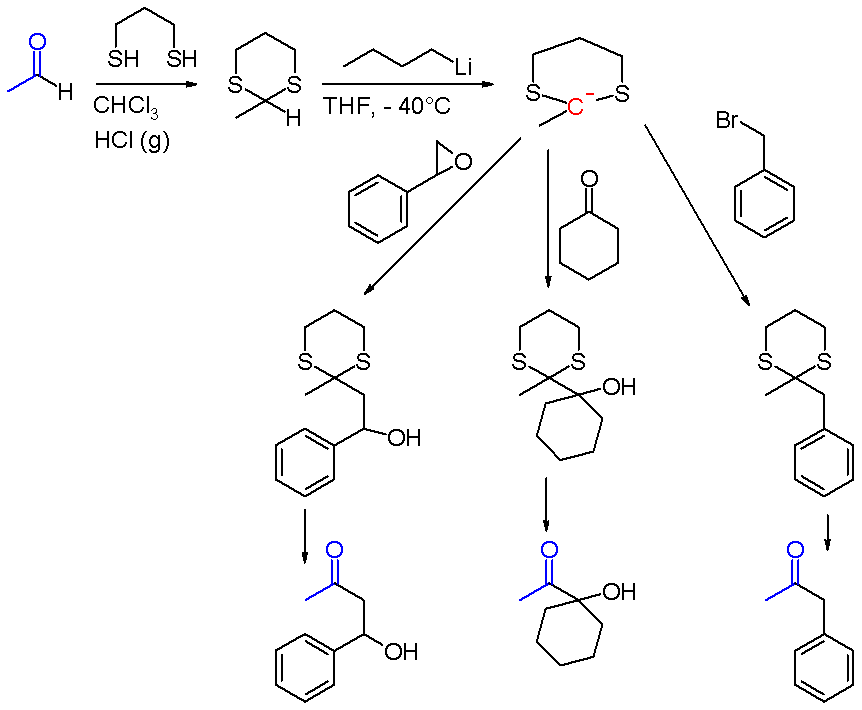
Scheme 1. Dithiane chemistry

Dithiane chemistry opens the way to many new chemical transformations. One example is found in so-called anion relay chemistry in which a negative charge of an anionic functional group resulting from one organic reaction is transferred to a different location within the same carbon framework and available for secondary reaction. In this example of a multi-component reaction both formaldehyde (1) and isopropylaldehyde (8) are converted into dithianes 3 and 9 with 1,3-propanedithiol. Sulfide 3 is first silylated by reaction with tert-butyllithium and then trimethylsilyl chloride 4 and then the second acyl proton is removed and reacted with optically active (−)-epichlorohydrin 6 replacing chlorine. This compound serves as the substrate for reaction with the other dithiane 9 to the oxirane ring opening product 10. Under influence of the polar base HMPA, 10 rearranges in a 1,4-Brook rearrangement to the silyl ether 11 reactivating the formaldehyde dithiane group as an anion (hence the anion relay concept). This dithiane group reacts with oxirane 12 to the alcohol 13 and in the final step the sulfide groups are removed with (bis(trifluoroacetoxy)iodo)benzene.

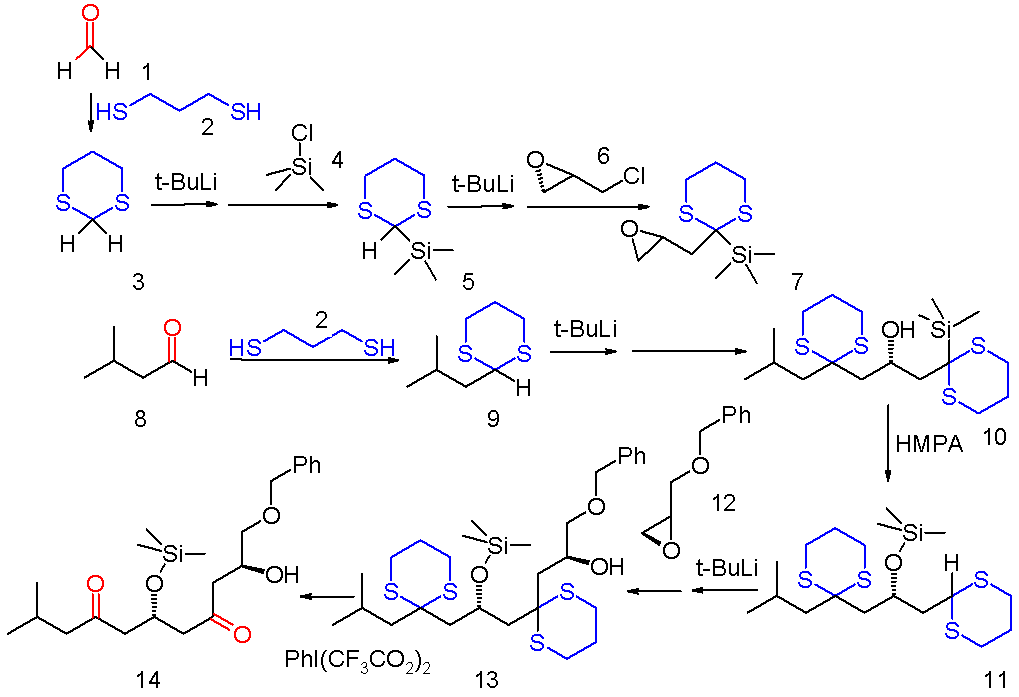
Scheme 2. Anion relay chemistry, Ph stands for phenyl

The anion relay chemistry tactic has been applied elegantly in the total synthesis of complex molecules of significant biological activity, such as spongistatin 2 and mandelalide A.

=== Oxidative bond formation ===
It is possible to form a bond between two carbons of (-) polarity by using an oxidant such as iodine. In this total synthesis of enterolactone, the 1,4- relationship of oxygen substituents is assembled by the oxidative homocoupling of a carboxylate enolate using iodine as the oxidant.

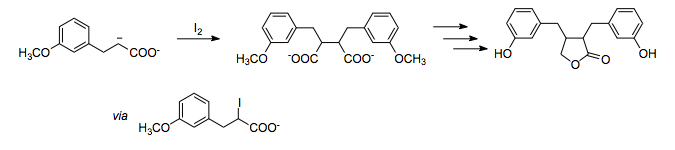

=== Amine umpolung ===
Ordinarily the nitrogen atom in the amine group is reacting as a nucleophile by way of its lone pair. This polarity can be reversed when a primary or secondary amine is substituted with a good leaving group (such as a halogen atom or an alkoxy group). The resulting N-substituted compound can behave as an electrophile at the nitrogen atom and react with a nucleophile as for example in the electrophilic amination of carbanions.

=== Hydrazone umpolung ===
Recently, various carbonyls have been turned into organometallic reagent surrogates via hydrazone umpolung by C.-J. Li et al. In the presence of a catalyst, similar to organometallic reagents, hydrazones can undergo nucleophilic additions, conjugate additions, and transition-metal catalyzed cross-couplings with various electrophiles to form new C-C bonds.
