= Corey–Nicolaou macrolactonization =

Chemical reaction

Named after	Elias James Corey; K. C. Nicolaou
Reaction type	Name reaction

Corey–Nicolaou macrolactonization is a named reaction of organic chemistry, for the synthesis of lactones from hydroxy acids, found in 1974. The reaction uses 2,2'-dipyridyldisulfide and triphenylphosphine as reagents and runs in polar aprotic solvent under mild conditions.

== Mechanism ==
The hydroxy acid first reacts with the 2,2'-Dipyridyldisulfide to form the corresponding 2-pyridinethiol ester, and after a proton transfer, the alkoxide attacks the carbonyl carbon, forming a tetrahedral transition state, before resolving back to the desired lactone and 2-pyridinethione.

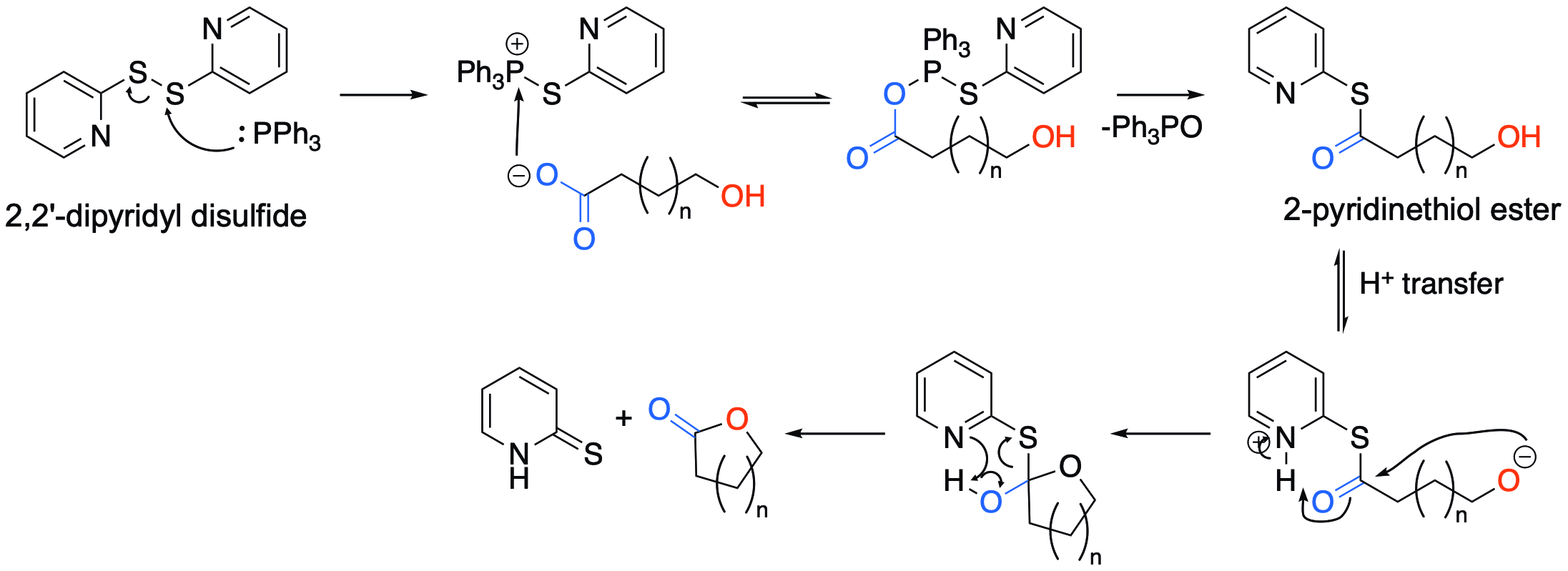

== Variants ==
Other heterocyclic disulfides have been used in place of 2,2'-dipyridyldisulfide.

== See also ==
- Shiina macrolactonization
- Ružička reaction
