= Ramakanth Sarabu =

Indian chemist (1955–2021)

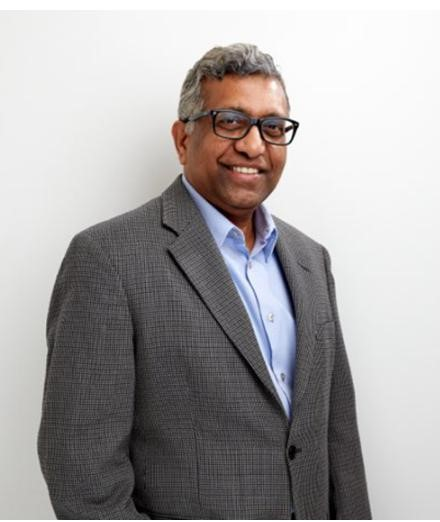
- Image of Ramakanth Sarabu
- Born: Ramakanth Sarabu; June 20, 1955; Telangana, India
- Died: February 11, 2021 (aged 65)
- Citizenship: American
- Education: Osmania University * Indian Institute of Technology * Case Western Reserve University * Harvard University
- Scientific career
- Fields: Medicinal Chemistry; Organic Chemistry; Drug Discovery; Diabetes Research
- Workplaces: Hoffmann-La Roche; Biocon Bristol Myers Squib; Cellarity

Ramakanth Sarabu (June 20, 1955 – February 11, 2021) was an Indian organic chemist. He is known for his contributions in diabetes research, specifically the work of Glucokinase activation as a treatment therapy for type 2 diabetes.

== Biography ==
Ramakanth Sarabu was born in Hyderabad, Telangana, where he received his early education. He earned a master's degree from Osmania University in organic chemistry and his doctorate from Indian Institute of Technology, Madras in molecular rearrangements from 1979 to 1984. In 1984 he moved to the US to pursue post-doctoral fellowship under Elias James Corey, at Harvard University. He did a second post-doctoral fellowship in 1985 at Case Western University in Cleveland, OH. He is known for his works and contributions in the domain of Glucokinase activation as a treatment therapy for type 2 diabetes.

He died on 11 February 2021 in Montville, New Jersey, while serving as the head of chemistry at Cellarity. Prior to that, from 1997 to 2012, he served at Hoffmann-La Roche at different positions like research leader, senior principal scientist etc. He then went on to become the head of medicinal chemistry at Biocon Bristol Myers Squibb R&D Center from 2012 to 2019.

== Notable publications ==
- Sarabu R, Grimsby J. Targeting glucokinase activation for the treatment of type 2 diabetes—a status review. Current Opinion in Drug Discovery & Development. 2005 Sep;8(5):631–637.
- Allosteric Activators of Glucokinase: Potential Role in Diabetes Therapy, Science Magazine 18 June 2003.
- Philip Garner and Sarabu Ramakanth, Stereodivergent synthesis of threo and erythro 6-amino-6-deoxyheptosulose derivatives via an optically active oxazolidine aldehyde, https://doi.org/10.1021/jo00363a044
- Philip Garner and Sarabu Ramakanth, A regiocontrolled synthesis of N7- and N9-guanine nucleosides https://doi.org/10.1021/jo00241a032
- David R. Bolin, Amy L. Swain, Ramakanth Sarabu, Steven J. Berthel etc. Peptide and Peptide Mimetic Inhibitors of Antigen Presentation by HLA-DR Class II MHC Molecules. Design, Structure−Activity Relationships, and X-ray Crystal Structures https://doi.org/10.1021/jm000034h
- Glucokinase Activators for Diabetes Therapy – Franz M. Matschinsky, Bogumil Zelent, Nicolai Doliba, Changhong Li, Jane M. Vanderkooi, Ali Naji, Ramakanth Sarabu, Joseph Grimsby, Diabetes Care May 2011, 34 (Supplement 2) S236-S243; DOI: 10.2337/dc11-s236
- Glucokinase activation repairs defective bioenergetics of islets of Langerhans isolated from type 2 diabetics- Nicolai M. Doliba, Wei Qin, Habiba Najafi, Chengyang Liu, Carol W. Buettger, Johanna Sotiris, Heather W. Collins, Changhong Li, Charles A. Stanley, David F. Wilson, Joseph Grimsby, Ramakanth Sarabu, Ali Naji, and Franz M. Matschinsky, American Journal of Physiology. Endocrinology and Metabolism 2012 302:1, E87-E102, https://doi.org/10.1152/ajpendo.00218.2011
- Discovery of Piragliatin—First Glucokinase Activator Studied in Type 2 Diabetic Patients – Ramakanth Sarabu, Fred T. Bizzarro, Wendy L. Corbett etc. https://doi.org/10.1021/jm3008689
- Glucokinase Activators for the Potential Treatment of Type 2 Diabetes, Grimsby, J.; Berthel, S. J.; Sarabu, R.Current Topics in Medicinal Chemistry, Volume 8, Number 17, 2008, pp. 1524–1532(9), https://doi.org/10.2174/156802608786413483

== Notable Patents ==
- Para-amine substituted phenylamide glucokinase activators
- α-acyl- and α-heteroatom-substituted benzene acetamide glucokinase activators
- 5-substituted-six-membered heteroaromatic glucokinase activators
- DPP IV inhibitors
