= 1,4-Butanedithiol =

Names
- Preferred IUPAC name Butane-1,4-dithiol

Identifiers
CAS Number	1191-08-8
3D model (JSmol)	Interactive image
ChemSpider	71479
ECHA InfoCard	100.013.390
EC Number	214-728-3
PubChem CID	79148
UNII	7JD227IUMC
CompTox Dashboard (EPA)	DTXSID0061589
- InChI: Key: SMTOKHQOVJRXLK-UHFFFAOYSA-N; InChI=1S/C4H10S2/c5-3-1-2-4-6/h5-6H,1-4H2
- SMILES: C(CCS)CS

Properties
Chemical formula	C_{4}H_{10}S_{2}
Molar mass	122.24 g·mol^{−1}
Appearance	colorless liquid
Melting point	−53.9 °C (−65.0 °F; 219.2 K)
Boiling point	195.5 °C (383.9 °F; 468.6 K)

Hazards
- GHS labelling
Pictograms	(GHS07: Exclamation mark)
Signal word	Warning
Hazard statements	H315, H319, H335
Precautionary statements	P261, P264, P264+P265, P271, P280, P302+P352, P304+P340, P305+P351+P338, P319, P321, P332+P317, P337+P317, P362+P364, P403+P233, P405, P501
- Except where otherwise noted, data are given for materials in their standard state (at 25 °C [77 °F], 100 kPa). Infobox references

1,4-Butanedithiol is an organosulfur compound with the formula HSCH_{2}CH_{2}CH_{2}CH_{2}SH. It is a malodorous, colorless liquid that is highly soluble in organic solvents. The compound has found applications in biodegradable polymers.

== Reactions ==
Alkylation with geminal dihalides gives 1,3-dithiepanes. Oxidation gives the cyclic disulfide 1,2-dithiane:

HSCH_{2}CH_{2}CH_{2}CH_{2}SH + O → S_{2}(CH_{2})_{4} + H_{2}O

It forms self-assembled monolayers on gold.

It is also used in polyadditions along with 1,4-butanediol to form sulfur-containing polyester and polyurethanes containing diisocyanate. Several of these polymers are considered biodegradable and many of their components are sourced from non-petroleum oils.

== Related compounds ==
- Dithiothreitol
- 1,3-Propanedithiol
