= Tetrahedron Prize =

The Tetrahedron Prize for Creativity in Organic Chemistry or Bioorganic and Medicinal Chemistry is awarded annually by Elsevier, the publisher of Tetrahedron Publications. It was established in 1980 and named in honour of the founding co-chairmen of these publications, Professor Sir Robert Robinson and Professor Robert Burns Woodward. The prize consists of a gold medal, a certificate, and a monetary award of US $15,000.

== Prizewinners ==
Winners of the prize are:

- 2024 Eric N. Jacobsen
- 2023 Chuan He
- 2022 Chi-Huey Wong
- 2021 Richard Bruce Silverman
- 2020 Dale L. Boger
- 2019 Peter G. Schultz
- 2018 Stephen L. Buchwald and John Hartwig
- 2017 Laura L. Kiessling
- 2016 Ben Feringa
- 2015 William L. Jorgensen
- 2014 Barry Trost and Jirō Tsuji
- 2013 Shankar Balasubramanian
- 2012 Paul A. Wender
- 2011 Manfred T. Reetz
- 2010 Satoshi Ōmura
- 2009 Steven V. Ley
- 2008 Larry E. Overman
- 2007 J. Fraser Stoddart
- 2006 Hisashi Yamamoto
- 2005 Bernd Giese
- 2004 Koji Nakanishi
- 2003 Robert H. Grubbs and Dieter Seebach
- 2002 Kyriacos C. Nicolaou
- 2001 Yoshito Kishi
- 2000 Peter B. Dervan
- 1999 Henri B. Kagan
- 1998 David A. Evans and Teruaki Mukaiyama
- 1997 Stuart L. Schreiber
- 1996 Samuel Danishefsky
- 1995 Alan R. Battersby and A. Ian Scott
- 1993 Ryoji Noyori and K. Barry Sharpless
- 1991 William Summer Johnson
- 1989 Michael J. S. Dewar
- 1987 Arthur J. Birch
- 1985 Gilbert Stork
- 1983 Elias J. Corey
- 1981 Albert Eschenmoser

== See also ==
- List of chemistry awards
