= A. Ian Scott =

British-American chemist

Alastair Ian Scott FRS FRSE
- Born: 10 April 1928; Glasgow
- Died: 18 April 2007 (aged 79); Grapevine, Texas
- Citizenship: United States
- Known for: vitamin B12 biosynthesis
- Spouse: Elizabeth Wilson Walters
- Children: 2
- Awards: Ernest Guenther Award (1976); Tetrahedron Prize (1995); Bakerian Lecture (1996); Welch Award in Chemistry (2000); Davy Medal (2001)
- Scientific career
- Fields: organic chemistry
- Institutions: Texas A&M University

Alastair Ian Scott (10 April 1928 in Glasgow – 18 April 2007) was a British-American organic chemist who achieved international renown for elucidating the biosynthetic pathway of vitamin B12.

He occupied successive chairs of organic chemistry at the universities of British Columbia, Sussex, and Yale before moving to Texas A&M University in 1977. In 1980 he occupied the Forbes Chair of Organic Chemistry at the University of Edinburgh. He was named a distinguished professor of chemistry and biochemistry in 1981 at Texas A&M University, and remained there until the end of his career.

In 1964 he won the Corday-Morgan Medal of the Royal Society of Chemistry (RSC). He was awarded the 1975 Ernest Guenther Award and the 1994 Arthur C. Cope Scholar Award by the American Chemical Society (ACS). He gave the RSC Centenary Lecture in 1994 and the Royal Society Bakerian Lecture in 1996. He took the Tetrahedron Prize (1995), the RSC Natural Products Award (1996), the Welch Award in Chemistry (2000), the Royal Society's Davy Medal (2001), the Queen's Royal Medal of the Royal Society of Edinburgh (2001), and the ACS Nakanishi Prize (2003). He was Texas Scientist of the Year in 2002.

He was a Fellow of the Royal Society and the Royal Society of Edinburgh, the American Association for the Advancement of Science and the European Academy of Sciences. In addition, he was an honorary member of the Japanese Pharmacological Society.

== Personal life ==
Alastair Ian Scott married Elizabeth Wilson Walters at the University of Glasgow Memorial Chapel, on 4 March 1950. They had two children: Anne and William. Alastair died in Texas on 18 April 2007, following a heart attack. He was survived by his wife, two children and six grandchildren. Elizabeth died at her home in Grapevine, Texas on 13 September 2016, aged 89.
