= Eric Block =

American chemist

- Eric Block
- Born: January 25, 1942 (age 84); New York, New York, United States
- Education: Queens College of the City University of New York (B.S.), Harvard University (M.S., Ph.D.)
- Known for: Organosulfur chemistry Allium chemistry Olfaction chemistry
- Awards: Guggenheim Fellowship; Ernest Guenther Award; Kenneth A. Spencer Award; Sterling B. Hendricks Memorial Lectureship Award; Fellow of the American Chemical Society
- Scientific career
- Fields: Chemistry
- Workplaces: University at Albany, SUNY; University of Missouri-Saint Louis
- Doctoral advisor: Elias James Corey

Notes
- .

Eric Block (born January 25, 1942) is an American chemist whose research has focused on the chemistry of organosulfur and organoselenium compounds, Allium chemistry (the chemistry of garlic, onion, and other alliums), and the chemistry of olfaction. As of 2018, he is Distinguished Professor of Chemistry Emeritus at the University at Albany, SUNY.

== Biography ==
Eric Block was born in New York City in 1942. He received his B.S. (1962) degree from Queens College of the City University of New York, where he was elected to Phi Beta Kappa. After a research assistant position at Brookhaven National Laboratories he attended Harvard University, where he received his M.S. (1964), and Ph.D. (1967) degrees as both a National Science Foundation and National Institutes of Health Predoctoral Fellow, working with E. J. Corey as a graduate student in the area of organic synthesis using organosulfur compounds. After a postdoctoral fellowship at Harvard with E. J. Corey, Block joined the faculty at the University of Missouri–St. Louis in 1967, becoming Professor in 1979. In 1981, he moved to the University at Albany, SUNY, where he was Chair of Chemistry from 1985–1991. He was named Distinguished Professor in 2002 and Carla Rizzo Delray Professor in 2006. In 2018 he became Emeritus Professor at Albany and Visiting Professor in the Chemistry Department at University of California, Irvine.

Block has also held visiting positions at the Harvard University (1974), University of Bologna (1984), Weizmann Institute (2000), Wolfson College, University of Cambridge (2006), Chinese Academy of Sciences (2013), and University of California, Los Angeles (2018).

== Research areas ==
Block is known for his research on organosulfur and organoselenium chemistry, particularly that of genus Allium plants, such as garlic and onion. This work is summarized in two monographs, two review articles, and is the subject of a 2014 American Chemical Society Webinar. Block's monograph on alliums has been published in a Chinese edition. Since 2005, another major area of collaborative research with neurobiology and computational chemistry colleagues has been the study of the molecular basis for olfaction, particularly the role of metals such as copper in olfaction and molecular mechanisms for sensing thiols as well as musk, such as muscone. With his collaborators Block has also examined the plausibility of the controversial vibration theory of olfaction, reaching the conclusion that it is implausible.

== Service ==
Block was a long-time editorial board member of the Journal of Agricultural and Food Chemistry and now is an honorary advisory board member. Block also served as associate editor (1984–1988) and editorial board member (1984–2000), for Phosphorus, Sulfur, Silicon and the Related Elements, as editorial board member and founding member of Heteroatom Chemistry, 1990–1995, and as associate editor for Organic Reactions, Volume 30. Block was a founding member and international advisory board member of the International Conference on Heteroatom Chemistry (ICHAC) series of meetings, and Chair of ICHAC-2, held in Albany, NY in 1989. He was also Chair of the Symposium on New Organosulfur Chemistry, Pacifichem 2015 in Honolulu, HI.

== Honors and awards ==
- Guggenheim Fellowship (1984–1985)
- ACS Award for the Advancement of Application of Agricultural and Food Chemistry, American Chemical Society (1987)
- Fellow Award: Agricultural and Food Chemistry Division, American Chemical Society (1993)
- International Council on Main Group Chemistry Award for Excellence in Main Group Chemistry Research (1994)
- Kenneth A. Spencer Award, Kansas City Section American Chemical Society (2003)
- Sterling B. Hendricks Memorial Lectureship Award (Agricultural Research Service of the United States Department of Agriculture) (2012)
- Fellow, American Association for the Advancement of Science (2012)
- Fellow, American Chemical Society (2014)
- Ernest Guenther Award for the Chemistry of Natural Products of the American Chemical Society (2016)
- Christopher S. Foote Lecturer, Chemistry Department, University of California, Los Angeles (2018)

== Selected publications ==
Block has published five books and 258 articles; his books and several of his most cited and recent papers are listed below.

Books

- Block, E. (1978). Reactions of Organosulfur Compounds. Academic Press. ISBN 978-0-12-107050-2.
- Block, E., ed. (1990). Heteroatom Chemistry. VCH. ISBN 978-3-527-27858-9.
- Block, E., ed. (1994). Advances in Sulfur Chemistry. JAI Press. ISBN 0-89232-868-1.
- Block, E. (2010). Garlic and Other Alliums: The Lore and the Science. Royal Society of Chemistry. ISBN 978-0-85404-190-9.
- Block, E. (2017). Garlic and Other Alliums: The Lore and the Science, Chinese Edition [神奇的葱蒜—传说与科学]. Chemistry Industry Press. ISBN 978-7-122-28930-8.

Reviews

- Block, E. (1985). "The chemistry of garlic and onions". Scientific American. 252 (3): 114–119. Bibcode:1985SciAm.252c.114B. doi:10.1038/scientificamerican0385-114. PMID 3975593.
- Block, E. (1992). "The organosulfur chemistry of the genus Allium — implications for organic sulfur chemistry". Angewandte Chemie International Edition. 104 (9): 1158–1203. doi:10.1002/anie.199211351. S2CID 50827982.
- Block, E.; Batista, V.S.; Matsunami, H.; Zhuang, H.; Ahmed, L. (2017). "The role of metals in mammalian olfaction of low molecular weight organosulfur compounds". Natural Product Reports. 34 (5): 529–557. doi:10.1039/c7np00016b. PMC 5542778. PMID 28471462.
- Block, E. (2018). "Molecular basis of mammalian odor discrimination: A status report". Journal of Agricultural and Food Chemistry. 66 (51): 13346–13366. Bibcode:2018JAFC...6613346B. doi:10.1021/acs.jafc.8b04471. PMID 30453735. S2CID 53873781.

Research papers

- Lin, D.Y.; Zhang, S.Z.; Block, E.; Katz, L.C. (2005). "Encoding social signals in the mouse main olfactory bulb". Nature. 434 (7032): 470–477. Bibcode:2005Natur.434..470L. doi:10.1038/nature03414. PMID 15724148. S2CID 162036.
- Duan, X.; Block, E.; Li, Z.; Connelly, T.; Zhang, J.; Huang, Z.; Su, X.; Pan, Y.; Wu, L.; Chi, Q.; Thomas, S.; Zhang, S.; Ma, M.; Matsunami, H.; Chen, G.-Q.; Zhang, H. (2012). "Crucial role of copper in detection of metal-coordinating odorants". Proc. Natl. Acad. Sci. USA. 109 (9): 3492–3497. Bibcode:2012PNAS..109.3492D. doi:10.1073/pnas.1111297109. PMC 3295281. PMID 22328155.
- Block, E.; et al. (2015). "Implausibility of the vibrational theory of olfaction". Proc. Natl. Acad. Sci. USA. 112 (21): E2766–E2774. Bibcode:2015PNAS..112E2766B. doi:10.1073/pnas.1503054112. PMC 4450420. PMID 25901328.
- Li, S.; Ahmed, L.; Zhang, R.; Pan, Y.; Matsunami, H.; Burger, J. L.; Block, E.; Batista, V. S.; Zhuang, H. (2016). "Smelling sulfur: Copper and silver regulate the response of human odorant receptor OR2T11 to low molecular weight thiols". Journal of the American Chemical Society. 138 (40): 13281–13288. Bibcode:2016JAChS.13813281L. doi:10.1021/jacs.6b06983. PMID 27659093. S2CID 7865518.
- Ahmed, L.; et al. (2018). "Molecular mechanism of activation of human musk receptors OR5AN1 and OR1A1 by (R)-muscone and diverse other musk-smelling compounds". Proc. Natl. Acad. Sci. USA. 115 (17): E3950–E3958. Bibcode:2018PNAS..115E3950A. doi:10.1073/pnas.1713026115. PMC 5924878. PMID 29632183.
- Block, E.; Dethier, B.; Bechand, B.; Cotelesage, J.J.H.; George, G.N.; Goto, K.; Pickering, I.J.; Rengifo, E.M.; Sheridan, R.; Sneeden, E.Y.; Vogt, L. (2018). "Ajothiolanes: 3,4-Dimethylthiolane natural products from garlic (Allium sativum)". Journal of Agricultural and Food Chemistry. 66 (39): 10193–10204. Bibcode:2018JAFC...6610193B. doi:10.1021/acs.jafc.8b03638. OSTI 1490686. PMID 30196701. S2CID 52178061.
- Haag, F.; Ahmed, L.; Reiss, K.; Block, E.; Batista, V.; Krautwurst, D. (2020). "Copper-mediated thiol potentiation and mutagenesis-guided modeling suggest a highly conserved copper-binding motif in human OR2M3". Cellular and Molecular Life Sciences. 77 (11): 2157–2179. doi:10.1007/s00018-019-03279-y. PMC 7256108. PMID 31435697.
- Vihani, A.; Hu, X.S.; Gundala, S.; Koyama, S.; Block, E.; Matsunami, H. (2020). "Semiochemical responsive olfactory sensory neurons are sexually dimorphic and plastic". eLife. 9: 133840. doi:10.7554/eLife.54501. PMC 7732343. PMID 33231170.
- Mengers, H.G.; Schier, C.; Zimmermann, M.; Gruhlke, M.C.H.; Block, E.; Blank, L.M.; Slusarenko, A.J. (2022). "Seeing the smell of garlic: Detection of gas phase volatiles from crushed garlic (Allium sativum), onion (Allium cepa), ramsons (Allium ursinum) and human garlic breath using SESI-Orbitrap MS". Food Chemistry. 397: e54501. doi:10.1016/j.foodchem.2022.133804. PMID 35932686. S2CID 251172694.
- Block, E.; Cotelesage, J.J.H.; Dikarev, E.; Garosi, B.; George, G.N.; Musah, R.A.; Vogt, L.I.; Wei, Z.; Zhang, Y. (2024). "Re-examination of the claimed isolation of stable noncyclic 1,2-disulfoxides". Organic Letters. 26 (45): 9619–9624. doi:10.1021/acs.orglett.4c02849. PMC 11574841. PMID 39230394.
- Block, E.; Bechand, B.; Gundala, S.; Vattekkatte, A.; Wang, K. (2025). "Fluorinated analogs of organosulfur compounds from garlic (Allium sativum): synthesis and chemistry". Molecules. 30 (13): 2841. doi:10.3390/molecules30132841. PMC 12251486. PMID 40649355.
