= Kyriacos Costa Nicolaou =

Cypriot-American chemist (born 1946)

K. C. Nicolaou
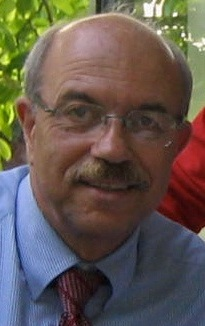
- Born: 5 July 1946 (age 80); Karavas, Cyprus
- Education: University College London
- Known for: Total synthesis Nicolaou Taxol total synthesis Corey–Nicolaou macrolactonization
- Awards: Ernest Guenther Award (1996); Wolf Prize in Chemistry (2016)
- Scientific career
- Fields: Chemistry
- Workplaces: Rice University Scripps Research Institute; University of California, San Diego; University of Pennsylvania ICES A*STAR
- Doctoral students: Tushar Kanti Chakraborty
- Other notable students: Phil Baran; Govindasamy Mugesh

Kyriacos Costa Nicolaou (Greek: Κυριάκος Κ. Νικολάου; born 5 July 1946) is a Greek Cypriot-American chemist known for his research in the area of natural products total synthesis. He is currently Harry C. and Olga K. Wiess Professor of Chemistry at Rice University, having previously held academic positions at The Scripps Research Institute/UC San Diego and the University of Pennsylvania.

== Biography ==
K. C. Nicolaou was born on July 5, 1946, in Karavas, Cyprus where he grew up and went to school until the age of 18. In 1964, he went to England where he spent two years learning English and preparing to enter University. He studied chemistry at the University of London (B.Sc., 1969, Bedford College; Ph.D. 1972, University College London, with Professors F. Sondheimer and P. J. Garratt). In 1972, he moved to the United States and, after postdoctoral appointments at Columbia University (1972–1973, Professor T. J. Katz) and Harvard University (1973–1976, Professor E. J. Corey), he joined the faculty at the University of Pennsylvania where he became the Rhodes-Thompson Professor of Chemistry. While at Penn, he won the Sloan Fellowship.

In 1989, he relocated to San Diego, where he took up a joint appointment at the University of California, San Diego, where he served as Professor of Chemistry, and The Scripps Research Institute, where he was Darlene Shiley Professor of Chemistry and Chairman of the Department of Chemistry. In 1996, he was appointed Aline W. and L.S. Skaggs Professor of Chemical Biology in The Skaggs Institute for Chemical Biology, The Scripps Research Institute. From 2005 to 2011, he directed Chemical Synthesis Laboratory @ ICES-A*STAR, Singapore. In 2013, Nicolaou moved to Rice University.

The Nicolaou group is active in the field of organic chemistry with research interests in methodology development and total synthesis. He is responsible for the synthesis of many complex molecules found in nature, such as Taxol and vancomycin. His group's route to Taxol, completed in 1994 at roughly the same time as a synthesis by the group of Robert A. Holton, attracted national news media attention due to Taxol's structural complexity and its potent anti-cancer activity.

== Total syntheses accomplished ==
- Endiandric acids A–D (1982)
- Amphoteronolide B and Amphotericin B (1987)
- Calicheamicin γ_{1} (1992)
- Sirolimus (1993)
- Taxol (1994)
- Zaragozic acid A (1994)
- Brevetoxin B (1995)
- Vancomycin (1998)
- Uncialamycin (2008)
- Sporolide B (2009)
- Viridicatumtoxin B (2013)
- Shishijimicin A (2015)
- Thailanstatin A (2016)
- Gukulenin B (2022)

== Books ==
He is also the co-author of four popular books on total synthesis:

1. Classics in Total Synthesis I, 1996
2. Classics in Total Synthesis II, 2003
3. Classics in Total Synthesis III, 2011
4. Classics in Total Synthesis IV, 2025

Additionally, he authored or co-authored several other books:

1. Molecules That Changed the World, 2008
2. Handbook of Combinatorial Chemistry: Drugs, Catalysts, Materials, 2002
3. Selenium in Natural Products Synthesis, 1984

== Awards ==
K. C. Nicolaou has received numerous awards and honors including:

- 2021 Robert Koch Gold Medal (Germany)
- 2016 Wolf Prize in Chemistry (Israel)
- 2011 Benjamin Franklin Medal in Chemistry (Franklin Institute USA)
- 2005 Arthur C. Cope Award (USA)
- 2003 Nobel Laureate Signature Award in Graduate Education (with Phil S. Baran)
- 2002 Tetrahedron Prize
- 2001 Ernst Schering Prize (Germany)
- 2000 Paul Karrer Gold Medal (Switzerland)
- 1998 Esselen Award (USA)
- 1996 Linus Pauling Award (USA)
- 1996 William H. Nichols Medal (USA)
- Aspirin Prize (Spain)
- Max Tishler Prize Lecture (Harvard)
- Yamada Prize (Japan)
- Janssen Prize (Belgium)
- Nagoya Medal (Japan)
- Centenary Medal (Royal Society UK)
- Inhoffen Medal (Germany)
- ACS Award for Creative Work in Synthetic Organic Chemistry (USA)
- ACS Guenther Award in Natural Products Chemistry (USA)
- Fellow of the American Academy of Arts and Sciences
- Member of the National Academy of Sciences
- Member of the American Philosophical Society
- Foreign Member of the Royal Society (2013)
- Several honorary degrees
