= Gojko Lalic =

American chemistry professor

- Born: Serbia
- Occupations: Professor of Chemistry, University of Washington
- Known for: Lalic Research Group
- Website: https://faculty.washington.edu/lalic/People.shtml

Gojko Lalic (Serbian Cyrillic: Гојко Лалић) is an American chemistry professor and head of a university research lab.

== Biography ==
Lalic is a Professor of Chemistry at the University of Washington in Seattle, having joined the faculty in 2008. He also heads the Lalic Research Group which addresses the synthesis of complex organic molecules used in the pharmaceutical industry.

Since 2001, he has contributed to approximately 50 cited papers. Lalic also has two patents for methods and kits that analyse reaction products. Additionally, he regularly speaks at academic seminars.

Born in Serbia, Lalic received his bachelors of science in 1998 from the University of Belgrade. His doctorate is from Harvard University, obtained in 2004. From 2004 to 2008, he undertook two postdoctoral Fellowships, one from UC Berkeley and the other from Harvard University.

== Awards ==
- National Science Foundation CAREER Award
- Eli Lilly Predoctoral Fellowship
- Certificate of Distinction in Teaching, Harvard University
- Eli Lilly Predoctoral Fellowship
- 1998 Vojislav Stojanovic Award for Outstanding Academic Achievement, University of Belgrade, Serbia
- Fellowship for Talented Students in Sciences and Arts, Ministry of Science, Serbia
