= Hisashi Yamamoto =

Japanese chemist (born 1943)

- 山本 尚
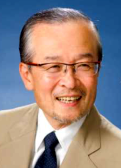
- Hisashi Yamamoto
- Born: July 16, 1943 (age 83); Kobe, Japan
- Education: Kyoto University; Harvard University
- Awards: Tetrahedron Prize (2006); Japan Academy Prize (2007); Humboldt Prize (2007)
- Scientific career
- Fields: Chemistry
- Workplaces: University of Chicago; Nagoya University; Chubu University

Hisashi Yamamoto (山本 尚, Yamamoto Hisashi) (born July 16, 1943) is a prominent organic chemist and currently a member of the faculty at the University of Chicago and professor of Chubu University.

== Life ==
Born in Kobe, Japan, Yamamoto earned a B.S. at Kyoto University in 1967 and a Ph.D. at Harvard University in 1971.

He was a professor at Nagoya University from 1983 until 2002 and has since been a professor within the Department of Chemistry at the University of Chicago. His research work is largely in the chemistry of acid catalysts that play an important role in triggering or driving chemical reactions, specifically Lewis and Brønsted acid catalysts used in selective organic synthesis. Yamamoto has authored or co-authored several books on topics in modern synthetic organic chemistry. As of 2021, his h-index equals to 120 with more than 64,000 citations.

== Awards and recognitions ==
- 1988 Japan IBM Science Prize
- 1992 Chunichi Culture Award
- 2002 Medals with Purple ribbon
- 2003 Fellow of the American Association for the Advancement of Science (AAAS)
- 2004 Yamada-Koga Prize
- 2006 Tetrahedron Prize for Creativity in Organic Chemistry & BioMedicinal Chemistry
- 2007 Japan Academy Prize (academics)
- 2007 Humboldt Prize
- 2011 The Ryoji Noyori Prize
- 2012 Fujihara Award
- 2017 The Roger Adams Award (American Chemical Society)
- 2018 Person of Cultural Merit
- 2025 Order of Culture
