= 2,2'-Dipyridyldisulfide =

2,2′-Dipyridyldisulfide

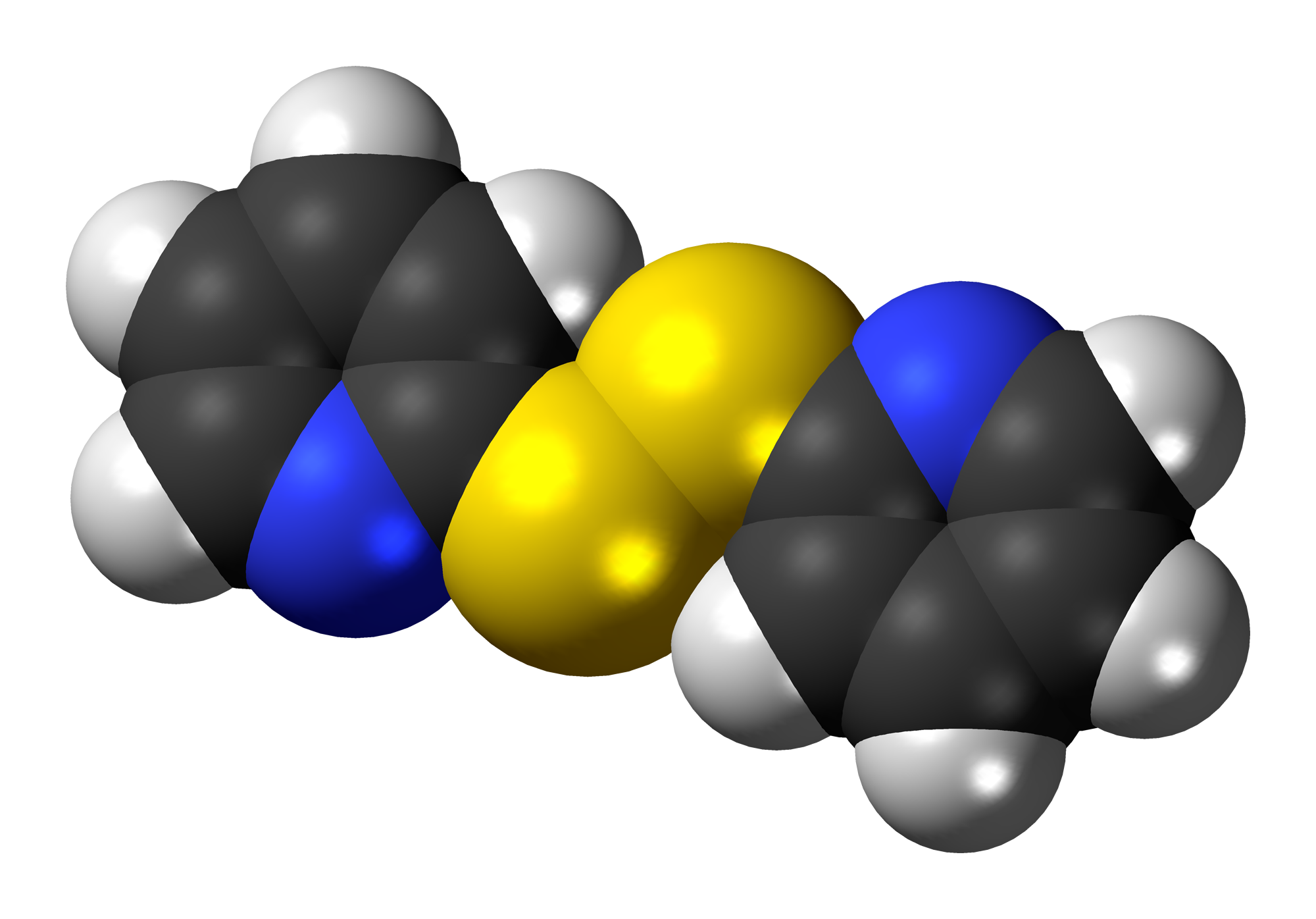

Names
- Preferred IUPAC name 2,2′-Disulfanediyldipyridine
- Other names 1,2-Di(pyridin-2-yl)disulfane (not recommended); 2,2′-Dipyridyldisulfide; 2,2′-Dipyridyldisulphide; Aldrithiol-2

Identifiers
CAS Number	2127-03-9
3D model (JSmol)	Interactive image; Interactive image
ChEBI	CHEBI:143170
ChEMBL	ChEMBL118678
ChemSpider	58603
ECHA InfoCard	100.016.676
EC Number	218-343-1
PubChem CID	65093
UNII	L6X912UPBU
CompTox Dashboard (EPA)	DTXSID70175517
- InChI: InChI=1S/C10H8N2S2/c1-3-7-11-9(5-1)13-14-10-6-2-4-8-12-10/h1-8H Key: HAXFWIACAGNFHA-UHFFFAOYSA-N; InChI=1/C10H8N2S2/c1-3-7-11-9(5-1)13-14-10-6-2-4-8-12-10/h1-8H Key: HAXFWIACAGNFHA-UHFFFAOYAJ
- SMILES: S(Sc1ncccc1)c2ncccc2; c1ccnc(c1)SSc2ccccn2

Properties
Chemical formula	C_{10}H_{8}N_{2}S_{2}
Molar mass	220.31 g·mol^{−1}
Melting point	56 to 58 °C (133 to 136 °F; 329 to 331 K)

Hazards
- Occupational safety and health (OHS/OSH)
Main hazards	Irritant (Xi)
- GHS labelling
Pictograms	(GHS07: Exclamation mark)
Signal word	Warning
Hazard statements	H315, H319, H335
Precautionary statements	P261, P264, P271, P280, P302+P352, P304+P340, P305+P351+P338, P312, P321, P332+P313, P337+P313, P362, P403+P233, P405, P501
- Except where otherwise noted, data are given for materials in their standard state (at 25 °C [77 °F], 100 kPa). verify (what is ?) Infobox references

2,2′-Dipyridyldisulfide, sometimes known as DPS, is used for preparing thiols and activating carboxylic acid for coupling reactions, as in the following reaction:

== Uses ==
It is also used in molecular biology as an oxidising agent, for example to oxidise free thiols to form disulfide bonds in proteins.
