= Corey–Seebach reaction =

Chemical reaction

Named after	Elias James Corey; Dieter Seebach
Reaction type	Coupling reaction

Identifiers
Organic Chemistry Portal	corey-seebach-reaction

The Corey–Seebach reaction, or Seebach Umpolung is a name reaction of organic chemistry that allows for acylation by converting aldehydes into lithiated 1,3-dithianes. The lithiated 1,3-dithianes serves as an acyl anion equivalent, undergoing alkylation with electrophiles. The reaction is named in honor of its discoverers, Elias J. Corey and Dieter Seebach.

== Implementation ==
The aldehyde is first converted into a dithiane, usually with 1,3-propanedithiol. The resulting 1,3-dithiane is then lithiated with the use of butyllithium. The 2-lithio-1,3-dithiane reacts with electrophiles to give a 2-alkyl-1,3-dithiane.

Finally, the 2-alkyl-1,3-dithiane can be converted to a carbonyl by hydrolysis, usually with the use of mercury(II) oxide. Alternatively the 2-alkyl-1,3-dithiane can be reduced to an alkane.

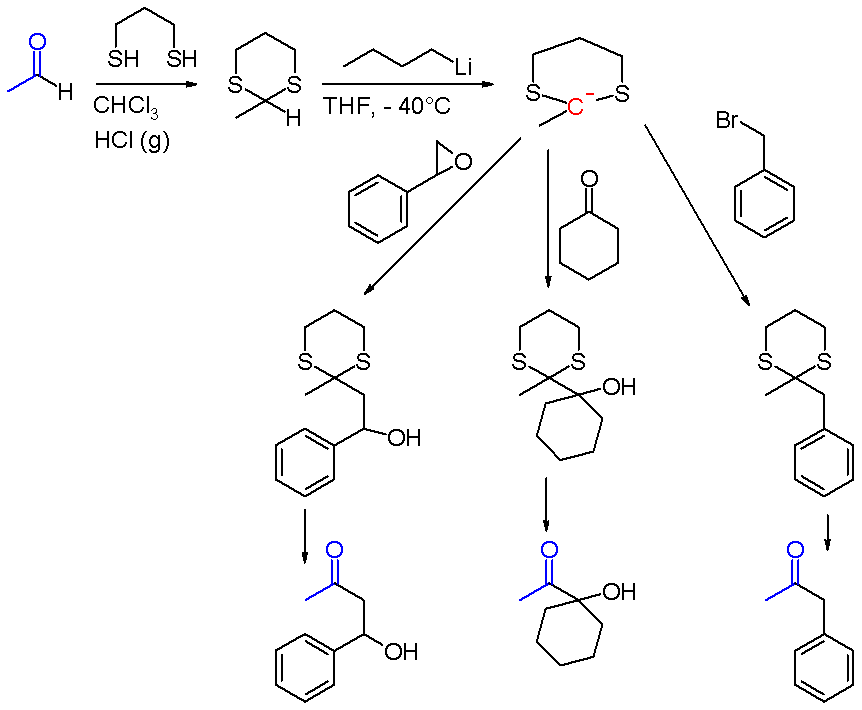

== Scope ==
As a strategy for protecting aldehydes and ketones, dithiane formation is cumbersome because deprotection is inefficient. Typically ketones and aldehydes are protected as they are dioxolanes instead of dithianes. The Corey–Seebach reaction is of interest as an acyl anion equivalent, allowing aldehydes to be converted to ketones.

The lithiated 1,3-dithiane can be alkylated with alkyl halides, epoxides, ketones, acyl halides, and iminium salts, which after hydrolysis of dithioacetals can yield ketones, β-hydroxyketones, α-hydroxyketones, 1,2-diketones and α-aminoketones. Notably, α-hydroxyketones and 1,2-diketones can not be generated through typical reactions of aldehydes such as the aldol reaction. Other possible electrophiles include aldehydes, amides, and esters.

The reaction between lithiated 1,3-dithianes and arenesulfonates offers a similar path to that of alkyl halides, being able to form dithioacetals which can be converted to ketones.

== Historic references ==
- Corey, Elias James; Seebach, Dieter (1 December 1965). "Synthesis of 1,n-Dicarbonyl Derivates Using Carbanions from 1,3-Dithianes". Angewandte Chemie International Edition. 4 (12): 1077–1078. doi:10.1002/anie.196510771.
- Corey, Elias James; Seebach, Dieter (1 December 1966). "Phenylthiomethyllithium and Bis(phenylthio)methyllithium". The Journal of Organic Chemistry. 31 (12): 4097–4099. doi:10.1021/jo01350a052.
- Seebach, Dieter; Corey, Elias James (1 January 1975). "Generation and synthetic applications of 2-lithio-1,3-dithianes". The Journal of Organic Chemistry. 40 (2): 231–237. doi:10.1021/jo00890a018.
