= Weston T. Borden =

American computational chemist

Weston Thatcher Borden (born 1943) is an American chemist with research interests in computational chemistry, organic chemistry, and organometallic chemistry. He is Distinguished Research Professor Emeritus in chemistry at the University of North Texas, where he was formerly Welch Chair and professor of computational chemistry. He previously taught for many years at the University of Washington.

== Early life and education ==
Weston Borden was born in 1943 in New York City, the son of Martin L. Borden and Doris Weston, who was a singer and a Hollywood star in the 1930s. He earned bachelor's, master's, and doctoral degrees from Harvard University, where his Ph.D. dissertation was titled "Electronic structure and geometrical isomerism in allene; some new synthetic routes to an optically active allene". As a graduate student, he studied theoretical chemistry at Cambridge University for a year.

== Career ==
From 1968 to 1973, Borden was an assistant professor at Harvard. He then joined the University of Washington as an associate professor, where he became a full professor in 1977. He taught there until 2004, when he was appointed as the inaugural Robert A. Welch Professor of Chemistry and a professor of computational chemistry at the University of North Texas. He was named a Distinguished University Research Professor at the University of North Texas in 2010 and Distinguished Research Professor Emeritus in 2018 following his retirement. He was a member of the Center for Advanced Scientific Computing and Modeling, located at the University of North Texas, and from 1999 was associate editor of the Journal of the American Chemical Society.

== Awards ==
Borden has been awarded fellowships by the Sloan Foundation, the Guggenheim Foundation, the Alexander von Humboldt Foundation, and the Japan Society for the Promotion of Science, among others. The American Chemical Society awarded him a 2005 National Award and the James Flack Norris Award in Physical Organic Chemistry. He was elected a fellow of the Fellow of the American Association for the Advancement of Science in 2005 and was named to the American Chemical Society's inaugural class of fellows in 2009.

== Personal life ==
Borden and his wife Sheila, also a chemist, have endowed lecture series at the University of Washington (in 2015) and at the University of North Texas (in 2005, in honor of Ernest Davidson).

== Selected publications ==
- Modern Molecular Orbital Theory for Organic Chemists. Prentice-Hall, 1975. ISBN 9780135959831.
- (Ed.) Diradicals. Wiley, 1982. ISBN 9780471086611.
- "Diradicals". doi:10.1002/0470845015.cda017. In: Encyclopedia of Computational Chemistry. Wiley, 2002. ISBN 9780470845011.
