= Dithiane =

Dithianes
- 1,2-dithiane (left), 1,3-dithiane and 1,4-dithiane (right)

Names
- Other names Dithiacyclohexanes

Identifiers
CAS Number	1,2-dithiane: 505-20-4; 1,3-dithiane: 505-23-7; 1,4-dithiane: 505-29-3
3D model (JSmol)	1,2-dithiane: Interactive image; 1,3-dithiane: Interactive image; 1,4-dithiane: Interactive image
ChemSpider	1,2-dithiane: 120109; 1,3-dithiane: 10019; 1,4-dithiane: 10020
PubChem CID	1,2-dithiane: 136335; 1,3-dithiane: 10451; 1,4-dithiane: 10452
UNII	1,2-dithiane: 3274B1T5A0
- InChI: 1,2-dithiane: InChI=1S/C4H8S2/c1-2-4-6-5-3-1/h1-4H2 Key: CXWGKAYMVASWDQ-UHFFFAOYSA-N; 1,3-dithiane: InChI=1S/C4H8S2/c1-2-5-4-6-3-1/h1-4H2 Key: WQADWIOXOXRPLN-UHFFFAOYSA-N; 1,4-dithiane: InChI=1S/C4H8S2/c1-2-6-4-3-5-1/h1-4H2 Key: LOZWAPSEEHRYPG-UHFFFAOYSA-N
- SMILES: 1,2-dithiane: C1CCSSC1; 1,3-dithiane: C1CSCSC1; 1,4-dithiane: C1CSCCS1

Properties
Chemical formula	C_{4}H_{8}S_{2}
Molar mass	120.23 g·mol^{−1}
Melting point	32.5 °C (90.5 °F; 305.6 K) other isomers: 54 (1,3), 112.3 (1,4)
- Except where otherwise noted, data are given for materials in their standard state (at 25 °C [77 °F], 100 kPa). Infobox references

A dithiane is a heterocyclic compound composed of a cyclohexane core structure wherein two methylene bridges (−CH_{2}− units) are replaced by sulfur. The three isomeric parent heterocycles are 1,2-dithiane, 1,3-dithiane and 1,4-dithiane. They are all colorless solids.

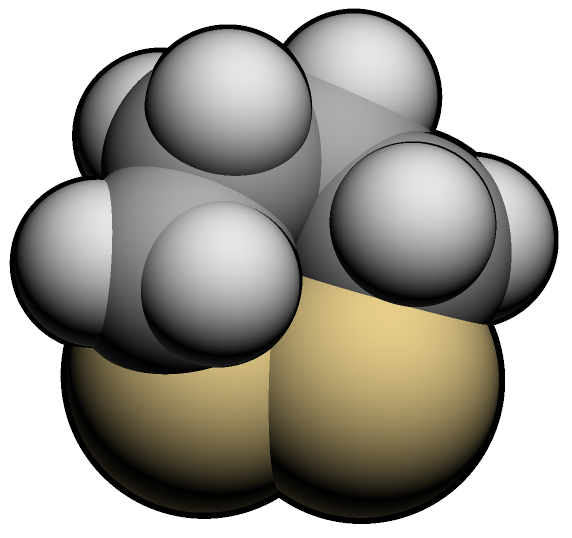
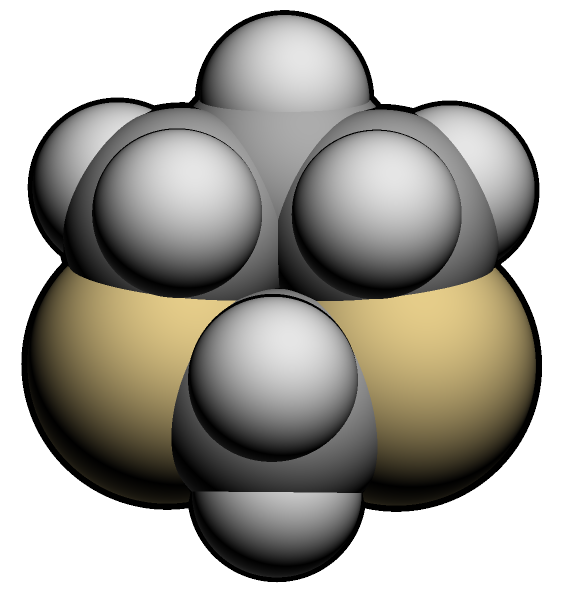
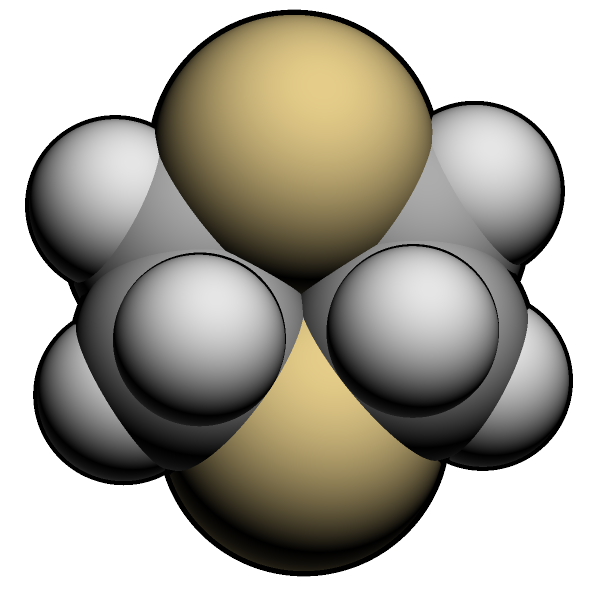
Space filling models of 1,2-dithiane (left), 1,3-dithiane and 1,4-dithiane (right)

== 1,2-Dithiane ==
1,2-Dithiane is an organosulfur compound with the formula S_{2}C_{4}H_{8}. It is one of three isomers of the formula (CH_{2})_{4}S_{2}. The 1,2-isomer, a disulfide, arises by the oxidation of 1,4-butanedithiol.

== 1,3-Dithiane ==
1,3-Dithiane is an organosulfur compound with the formula CH_{2}S_{2}C_{3}H_{6}. It is one of three isomers of the formula (CH_{2})_{4}S_{2}. The 1,3-isomer arises by the reaction of 1,3-propanedithiol with formaldehyde.

1,3-Dithianes are sometimes used as protecting group of carbonyl-containing compounds. They form by treatment of the carbonyl compound with 1,3-propanedithiol under conditions that remove water from the system. The protecting group can be removed with mercuric reagents, a process that exploits the high affinity of Hg(II) for thiolates. 1,3-Dithianes are more importantly employed in umpolung reactions, such as the Corey–Seebach reaction:

== 1,4-Dithiane ==
1,4-Dithiane is an organosulfur compound with the formula (SC_{2}H_{4})_{2}. It is one of three isomers of the formula (CH_{2})_{4}S_{2}. The 1,4-isomer, a bisthioether, arises by the alkylation of 1,2-ethanedithiol with 1,2-dibromoethane. It has no applications but traces occur as a product of degradations, e.g., cooking coal pyrolysis.
