= Marcey Waters =

Organic Chemistry researcher

Marcey L. Waters
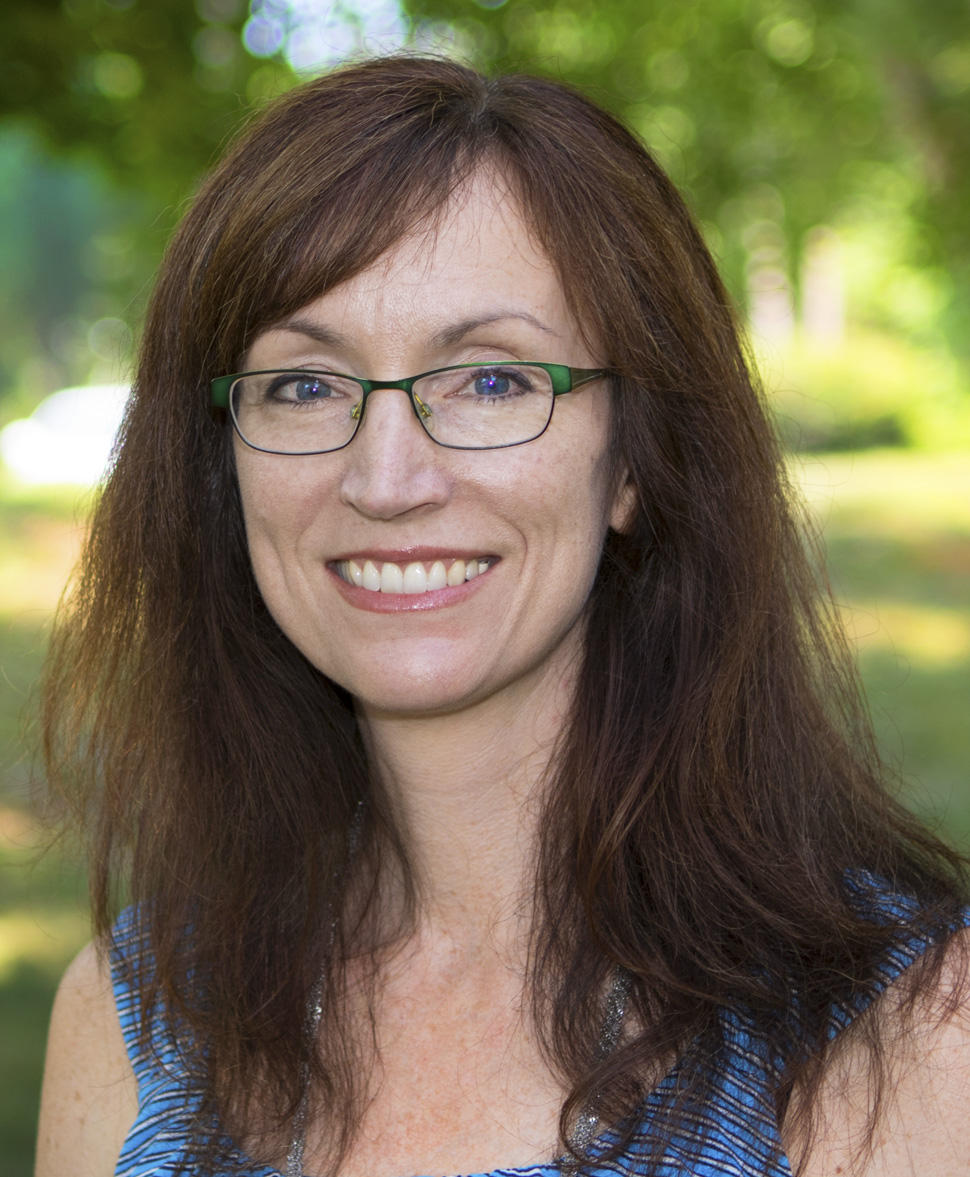
- Education: University of Chicago (1997 PhD)
- Known for: Bio-organic chemistry, Molecular recognition, Supramolecular chemistry, Peptide chemistry, Nuclear magnetic resonance, Peptidomimetics, and Combinatorial chemistry
- Scientific career
- Fields: Bio-organic Chemistry
- Workplaces: University of North Carolina, Chapel Hill
- Doctoral advisor: William Wulff
- Website: http://waters.chem.unc.edu/

Marcey Lynn Waters is the Glen H. Elder Jr., Distinguished Professor of Chemistry at the University of North Carolina, Chapel Hill (UNC-CH). She is an organic chemist whose research is at the interface of chemical biology and supramolecular chemistry. Waters has received multiple awards for research, teaching, and advocating for women in science. She served as president of the American Peptide Society (APS) from 2017 to 2019.

== Education ==
Waters graduated from the University of California, San Diego with a degree in chemistry in 1992. While an undergraduate, she worked with Prof. Charles L. Perrin studying fundamental aspects of aromaticity. Waters entered the University of Chicago for her doctoral degree in chemistry, working with Prof. William D. Wulff studying the mechanism for the Wulff-Dotz benzannulation reaction between Fischer carbene complexes. and alkynes. Walters graduated from Chicago in 1997 with a PhD in chemistry. She was an NIH postdoctoral fellow in Prof. Ronald Breslow's group from 1997 to 1999, where she worked on dinuclear metalloenzyme mimics and antiaromaticity.

== Research ==
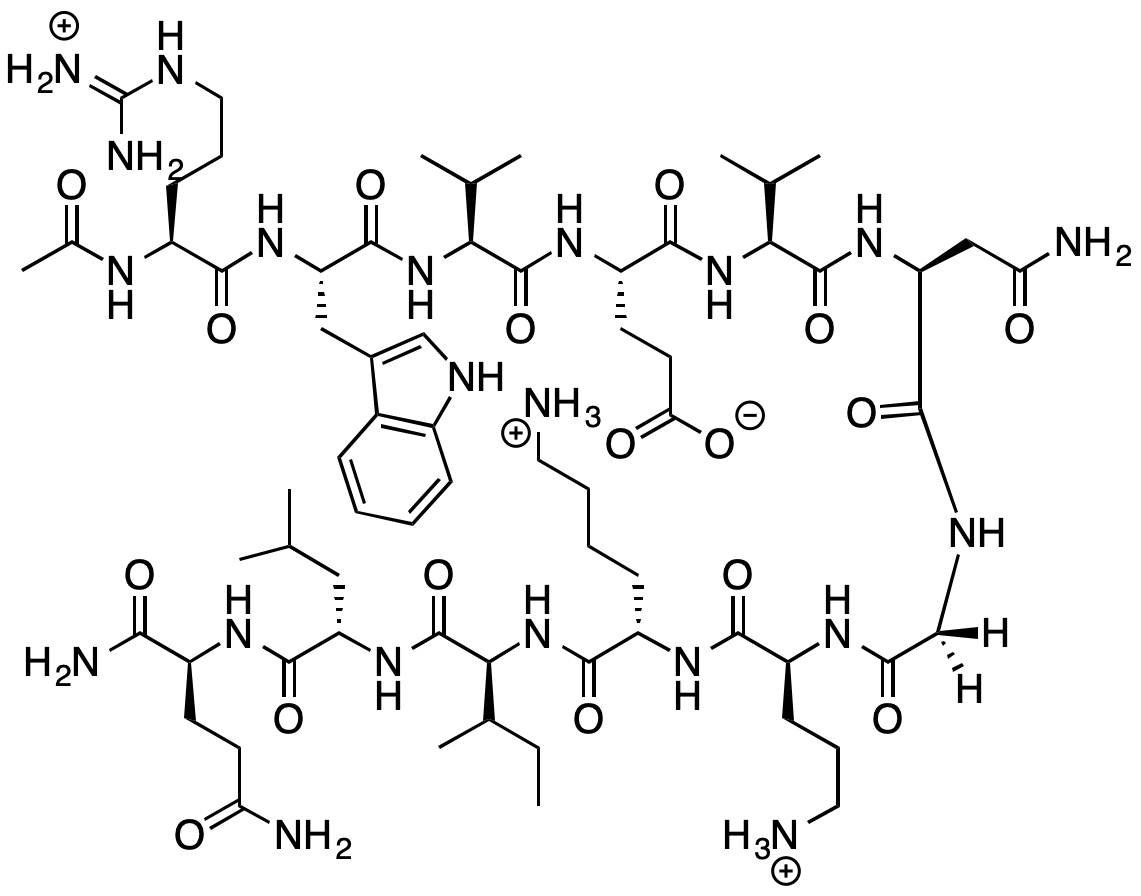
Beta-hairpin model peptide system

Waters joined UNC-Chapel Hill as an assistant professor in 1999. As of 2018, she is the Glen H. Elder, Jr. Distinguished Professor. Waters' research began with studies of non-covalent interactions in peptide beta-hairpin model systems, specifically, how pi-pi and cation-pi system interactions could influence peptide folding and function. This research can also extend to molecular recognition, in which specific peptide cavities can be designed to "host" selected organic molecules. Waters' group also studies protein and peptide methylation patterns and their biophysical interactions, which can relate to epigenetic disease mechanisms. She collaborated with faculty colleague Nancy Albritton to study degrons of proteolytically cleaved ubiquitins.

== Volunteer service ==
=== Mentorship ===
Waters was involved in mentorship of chemistry students from nontraditional and disadvantaged backgrounds as part of the American Chemical Society's Project SEED. She has advanced multiple campus groups encouraging women scholars in physical sciences. Waters mentored for TANDEMplusIDEA, the international mentoring program for female scientists from 2007 to 2009. Waters was on the board of directors for the Mesilla Chemistry Workshop held in July from 2006 to 2018. From 2011 to 2013, Waters was a UNC WOWS Scholar (Working on Women in Science). From 2013 to 2018, she was a Faculty Advisor for UNC WISE (Women in Science and Engineering, graduate student organization).

=== Journal and conference boards ===
In 2007, Waters served as co-chair for the International Symposium on Dynamic Combinatorial Chemistry (November). The year after that, she was an advisory board member of International Symposia on Macrocyclic and Supramolecular Chemistry (ISMSC). In 2009, she was a guest editor for the December issue of Current Opinion in Chemical Biology. From 2009 to 2015, she was an advisory board member of International Symposia on Macrocyclic and Supramolecular Chemistry (ISMSC). In 2011, Waters was a co-organizer of the Mesilla Chemistry Workshop on "Aromatic Interactions in Chemistry and Biology"(with Ken Houk, UCLA Dept of Chemistry). In 2012, Waters was a section editor for "Supramolecular Chemistry: From Molecules to Nanomaterials" (John Wiley and Sons). In 2013, she was the co-chair, of American Peptide Society Meeting (with David Lawrence, UNC Dept of Chemistry) and a guest editor for Accounts of Chemical Research for the "Aromatic Interactions in Chemistry and Biology" article in the April issue.

From 2014 to 2020, Waters was an editorial advisory board member of the Journal of the American Chemical Society.

== Awards and honors ==
- 2017 - Elected President of the American Peptide Society.
- 2018 - UNC University Award for the Advancement of Women
- 2017 - Fellow, American Association for the Advancement of Science
- 2015 - Mary Turner Lane Award, UNC
- 2014 - Tanner Award for Excellence in Undergraduate Teaching
- 2004 - Alfred P. Sloan Fellowship
- 2000 - NSF Career Award
- 1995–1996 - ACS Organic Division Research Fellowship
- 1992 - GAANN Fellow, Phi Beta Kappa
- 1991 - Howard Hughes Honors Research Fellowship (UCSD) and the NSF REU Fellowship (Columbia University)
