= Fischer carbene =

Transition metal carbene complex

A Fischer carbene is a type of transition metal carbene complex, which is an organometallic compound containing a divalent organic ligand. In a Fischer carbene, the carbene ligand is a σ-donor π-acceptor ligand. Because π-backdonation from the metal centre is generally weak, the carbene carbon is electrophilic.

Fischer carbenes are named for Ernst Otto Fischer.

== Structure ==
A metal carbene complex could be considered a Fischer carbene when the carbene is in singlet state. Delocalization of the lone pair from the substituent on carbene carbon raises the energy of p_{z} orbital, thus forcing the two of electrons of carbene stay as an electron pair. Bonding between carbene and the metal centre involves a strong σ donation from sp^{2} orbital to an empty d orbital on metal centre and a weak π back donation from the metal centre to the empty p_{z} orbital. Because the π donation is weak, the carbene carbon is electrophilic in nature.

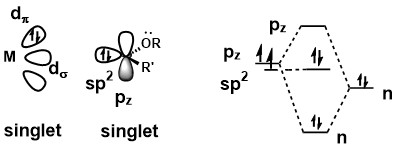

Because of this bonding property, Fischer carbenes often feature:

1. low oxidation state metal center
2. middle and late transition metals Fe(0), Mo(0), Cr(0)
3. π-acceptor metal ligands
4. π-donor substituents on the carbene atom such as alkoxy and alkylated amino groups.

== Preparation ==
The most common strategy to prepare a Fischer carbene is reaction between a metal carbonyl complex with organolithium compounds. The corresponding lithium enolate-like structure is highly stabilized, and thus, needs to be quenched by a highly electrophilic alkylating reagent such as Meerwein's salt. Alkylation with MeI could be done with a phase transfer system. Alternatively, the lithium cation could be exchanged with a tetraalkylammonium cation to give a more reactive enolate. This tetraalkylammonium salt could be acylated to give a highly electrophilic mixed anhydride-like Fischer carbene which could undergo nucleophilic substitution with alcohol.

Fischer carbenes with an α-hydrogen are prepared by reaction of a metal carbonyl anion with a formamide. Treating the intermediate with excess amount of trimethylsilyl chloride yields this particular group of Fischer carbene complex.

=== Elaboration of Fischer carbenes ===
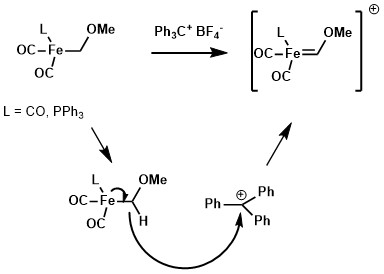

With a suitable hydride abstracting reagent, such as the trityl cation, the hydride on alkyl ligand of a metal complex could be abstracted to form a Fischer carbene.

=== Decarbonylation from an unstabilized metal carbenoid ===
In 2021, Alvarez et al reported that a Fischer carbene could be effectively prepared from a decarbonylative process of a metal carbenoid derived from a stabilized diazo compound.

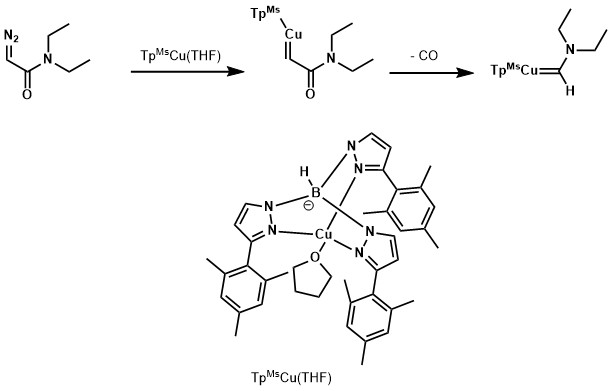

== Reactivity ==
=== Carbonyl-like reactivity ===
The carbene carbon of a Fischer carbene is electrophilic in nature. Thus, Fischer carbenes exhibit similar reactivity compared to carbonyl compounds. Many of the reactions can be understood by using the carboxylic equivalent structure such as transesterification, Michael addition, and aldol reaction. The Cr(CO)_{5} moiety is a strong electron withdrawing group making the α-proton highly acidic. A methoxy chromium carbene with a methyl side chain has a pK_{a} of 12.5 in aqueous acetonitrile (1:1 volume ratio). For comparison, methyl acetate has a pK_{a} of 25.6, demonstrating the strong electron withdrawing nature of the Cr(CO)_{5} moiety.

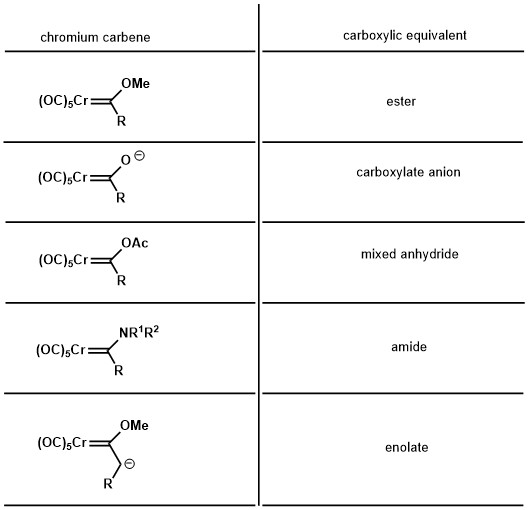

The strong electron withdrawing nature of Fischer carbenes is also reflected in many reactions. For instance, the Diels–Alder reaction between methyl acrylate and isoprene is completed in 7 days at room temperature with low para-meta selectivity. On the other hand, the Fischer carbene counterpart finished in 3 hours at room temperature with much higher para-meta selectivity.

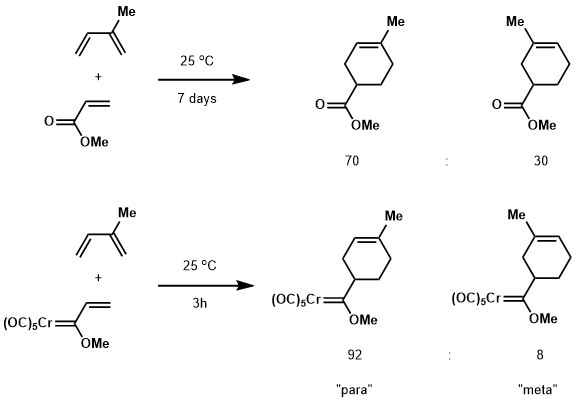

Urotropin, a weak nucleophile, could participate in a Michael addition to an alkynyl Fischer carbene, giving an interesting double addition product.

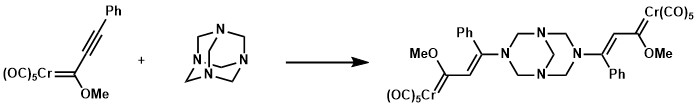

The enolate-like structure, obtaining by deprotonation of Fischer carbene, could be alkylated. However, because the carbanion is highly stabilized, a reactive alkylating reagent, such as methyl fluorosulfonate ("magic methyl" reagent) or methyl bromoacetate is needed.

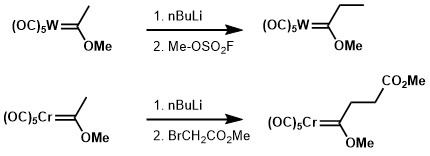

Aldol condensation of Fischer carbenes could be achieved by using much weaker bases compared to its carbonyl counterpart, such as triethylamine.

=== Demetallation ===
Fischer carbenes could be oxidized to the corresponding carbonyl compounds using mild oxidants such as ceric ammonium nitrate (CAN).

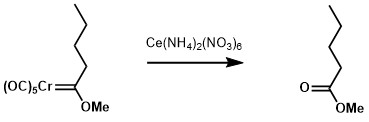

If the side chain of Fischer carbene bears an α-proton, it could be reversibly deprotonated with a weak base such as pyridine. This facilitates formation of chromium hydride species, which can undergo reductive elimination to give a cis-enol ether.

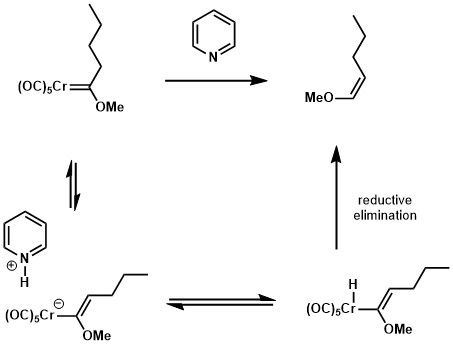

=== Photochemical properties of Fischer carbenes ===
The UV-Vis spectrum of a Fischer carbene shows a metal-to-ligand charge transfer band in the near ultraviolet. On the one hand, this excitation promotes an electron from a metal centered orbital to a ligand centered orbital, making the carbene carbon more electron rich. On the other hand, the metal centre, already electron poor because of the carbonyl ligands, becomes more electron poor, facilitating migratory insertion to the CO ligand. This migratory insertion gives a chromium metallacyclopropanone, which is a resonance form of the metallated ketene. With ketene reactivity, the species could be trapped by several nucleophiles such as alcohols and amines, or could react in [2+2] cycloaddition with alkenes, imines, or aldehyde yielding the corresponding cyclobutane, β-lactam, and β-lactone adducts.

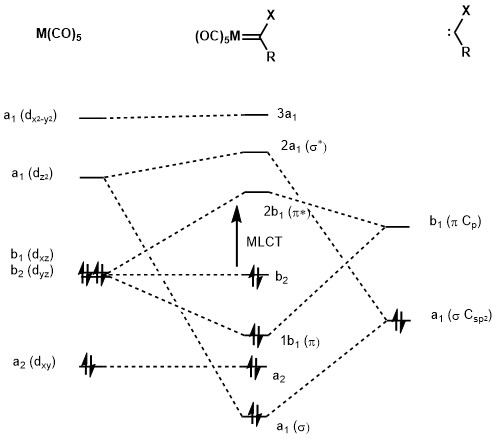

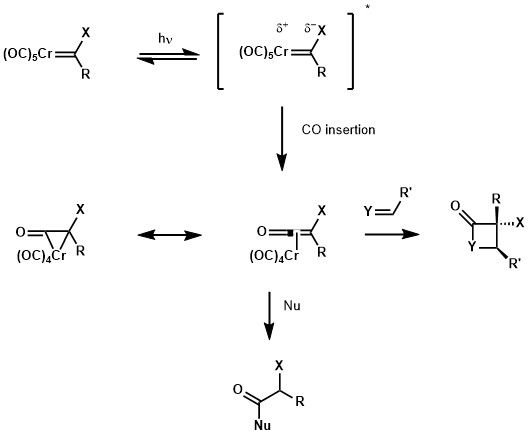

== See also ==
- Wulff–Dötz reaction
