= Jennifer Love =

Jennifer Love may refer to:

- Jennifer Love (chemist), American chemist
- Jennifer Love, Miss Nebraska 1994
- Jennifer Love Hewitt, American television and movie actress
