= Paul Wender (chemist) =

American chemist

Paul Anthony Wender
- Born: 1947 (age 78–79)
- Education: Wilkes College (B.S. 1969), Yale University (Ph.D. 1973)
- Known for: cycloaddition
- Scientific career
- Fields: Organic Chemistry
- Workplaces: Stanford
- Thesis: Part I. The Transformation of Ketones Into Nitriles. Part II. The Total Synthesis of Eremophilone. (1973)
- Doctoral advisor: Frederick E. Ziegler
- Other academic advisors: Gilbert Stork
- Doctoral students: Jennifer Love
- Website: web.stanford.edu/group/pawender/index.html

Paul Anthony Wender is an American chemist whose work is focused on organic chemistry, organometallic chemistry, synthesis, catalysis, chemical biology, imaging, drug delivery, and molecular therapeutics. He is currently the Francis W. Bergstrom Professor of Chemistry at Stanford University and is an elected fellow of the American Association for the Advancement of Science and the American Academy of Arts and Sciences.

== Biography ==
Born in 1947, Wender received a B.S. from Wilkes University in 1969, and a Ph.D. degree from Yale University in 1973. At Yale he worked with Frederick E. Ziegler, graduating with a thesis on the transformation of ketones into nitriles, and the total synthesis of eremophilone. He was a post-doctoral fellow at Columbia University in 1974. In 1974, he began his independent career as an assistant professor and later associate professor at Harvard University. In 1982, he became a professor at Stanford University. He is currently the Francis W. Bergstrom Professor of Chemistry there.

His research involves the targeted synthesis of complex biologically interesting molecules. He coined the term "function-oriented synthesis." He pursues applications for drugs in cancer therapy, for example, and synthesized phorbol, taxol, resiniferatoxin and prostatin, among others. Because of his work on the synthesis of indole derivatives, the Wender indole synthesis he described in 1981 was named after him.

== Selected awards and honors ==
- Ernest Guenther Award, 1988
- Arthur C. Cope Scholar Award, 1990
- Fellow, American Academy of Arts and Sciences, 1992
- American Chemical Society Award for Creative work in Synthetic Organic Chemistry, 1998
- Fellow, American Association for the Advancement of Science, 2001
- American Chemical Society H.C. Brown Award for Creative Research in Synthetic Methods, 2003
- Member of the National Academy of Sciences, 2003
- Tetrahedron Prize for Creativity in Organic Chemistry, 2012
- Foreign member - Spanish Royal Academy of Sciences, 2013
- ACS Arthur C. Cope Award, 2015

== See also ==
- Wender Taxol total synthesis
