= Richmond Sarpong =

Ghanaian-American chemist

- Born: April 23, 1974 (age 52); Bechem, Ghana
- Education: Princeton University Ph.D. (2001); Macalester College B.A. (1995)
- Scientific career
- Fields: Organic Chemistry, Total Synthesis
- Workplaces: California Institute of Technology; University of California, Berkeley
- Thesis: A study of enediyne functional analogs : model frameworks based on calicheamicin and esperamicin (2001)
- Doctoral advisor: Martin Semmelhack
- Other academic advisors: Rebecca Hoye, Brian Stoltz
- Website: sarponggroup.com

Richmond Sarpong (born April 23, 1974, in Bechem, Ghana) is a Ghanaian-American chemist who is the Henry Rapoport Professor of Chemistry at the University of California, Berkeley. Sarpong works on natural product total synthesis to better understand biological systems and allow for the development of novel therapeutics. He was awarded a Guggenheim Fellowship in 2017, and was elected to the American Academy of Arts and Sciences in 2020 and to the National Academy of Science in 2025. He serves on the editorial boards of Organic Syntheses, Accounts of Chemical Research and Synlett.

== Early life ==
Sarpong was born in Bechem, Ghana on April 23, 1974, and spent his early childhood in Bolgatanga. His mother is a teacher, and his father a medical doctor who also holds a master's degree in public health. It was during his childhood that Sarpong first became interested in chemistry, when he saw how effective the drug ivermectin was in combatting river blindness (onchocerciasis). Ivermectin was being distributed in Africa by Merck free of charge, and Sarpong's father worked with the World Health Organization to aid in the distribution of the drug. Sarpong got his hands on his father's copy of the Merck Index, an encyclopedia of chemicals, and spent his free time imagining how chemistry could change people's lives. In 1984, Sarpong's family moved to Livingstone, Zambia and later Lobatse, Botswana in 1986. In Zambia and Botswana, he saw the devastating impact of HIV/AIDS in Africa. In Botswana, Sarpong attended the Maru-a-Pula School, where he was introduced to organic chemistry by his teacher Dr. Ramakrishna. Having this additional mentor encouraged Sarpong to pursue a career in chemistry, despite having an offer from a premedical program at a British university.

== Education and training ==
Sarpong moved to the United States in 1991 to study chemistry at Macalester College. At Macalester, he conducted undergraduate research with Prof. Rebecca C. Hoye on the determination of absolute stereochemistry of organic molecules using the Mosher method. Sarpong graduated with his B.A. in chemistry in 1995.

Sarpong then pursued graduate studies with Prof. Martin Semmelhack at Princeton University. In Prof. Semmelhack's laboratory, he worked on organic compounds containing the enediyne functional group that model the activity of the calicheamicin class of antibiotics. Sarpong received his Ph.D. in 2001.

Sarpong moved to the California Institute of Technology where he joined the laboratory of Prof. Brian Stoltz as a UNCF-Pfizer Postdoctoral fellow. At Caltech, he worked alongside then-graduate student Neil Garg to complete the first total synthesis of the phosphate inhibitor dragmacidin D. Sarpong also developed a novel tandem Wolff/Cope rearrangement to synthesize fused ring molecules.

== Research and career ==
In 2004, Sarpong started his independent scientific career at the University of California, Berkeley as an assistant professor. He was promoted to associate professor in 2010 and full Professor in 2014.

The Sarpong group specialize in the synthesis of bioactive organic molecules, with a focus on the natural products of flora and fauna. He has developed new synthesis strategies for alkaloids, a family of natural medicines that includes quinine and morphine. In particular, Sarpong is interested in natural product synthesis for the treatment of neurodegenerative diseases.

In 2017, Sarpong delivered a talk at TEDx Berkeley entitled The face of disease in Sub-Saharan Africa, in which described the influences on his desire to pursue chemistry growing up in Africa, and also encouraged his audience to reevaluate their perceptions of disease in Africa. Sarpong is committed to improving diversity within the chemistry community, and has supported many scholars in the early stages of their academic careers.

== Awards and honors ==
- 2009 UC Berkeley College of Chemistry Teaching Award
- 2015 Royal Society of Chemistry Synthetic Organic Chemistry Award
- 2015 Arthur C. Cope Award
- 2016 Noyce Prize for Excellence in Undergraduate Teaching
- 2017 Guggenheim Fellowship
- 2019 International Society of Heterocyclic Chemistry A.R. Katritzky Award
- 2019 Society of Synthetic Organic Chemistry Japan (SSOJC) Mukaiyama Award
- 2020 Elected Fellow of the American Association for the Advancement of Science
- 2020 Member, American Academy of Arts and Sciences
- 2022 American Chemical Society Award for Creative Work in Synthetic Organic Chemistry
- 2025 Inhoffen Medal (Inhoffen-Medaille)
- 2025 Member, National Academy of Science

== Selected publications ==
- Palani, Vignesh; Hugelshofer, Cedric L.; Kevlishvili, Ilia; Liu, Peng; Sarpong, Richmond (2019). "A Short Synthesis of Delavatine A Unveils New Insights into Site-Selective Cross-Coupling of 3,5-Dibromo-2-pyrone". J. Am. Chem. Soc. 141 (6): 2652–2660. doi:10.1021/jacs.8b13012. PMID 30646686. S2CID 58587014.
- Roque, Jose B.; Kuroda, Yusuke; Göttemann, Lucas T.; Sarpong, Richmond (2018). "Deconstructive diversification of cyclic amines". Nature. 564 (7735): 244–248. doi:10.1038/s41586-018-0700-3.
- Marth, C. J.; Gallego, G. M.; Lee, J. C.; Lebold, T. P.; Kulyk, S.; Kou, K. G. M.; Qin, J.; Lilien, R.; Sarpong, R. (2015–12). "Network-analysis-guided synthesis of weisaconitine D and liljestrandinine". Nature. 528 (7583): 493–498. doi:10.1038/nature16440. ISSN 1476-4687.
- Jeffrey, Jenna L.; Sarpong, Richmond (2013). "Intramolecular C(sp3)–H amination". Chemical Science. 4 (11): 4092. doi:10.1039/c3sc51420j. ISSN 2041-6520.

== Personal life ==
Sarpong plays tennis in his free time. While attending Macalester College as an undergraduate, he set the 100-meter dash record.

Sarpong's sister, Martha Sarpong, is a R&D Director and Project Leader at GlaxoSmithKline Pharmaceuticals.
