= Melanie Sanford =

American chemist

- Born: June 16, 1975 (age 51)
- Education: Yale University (BS, MS); California Institute of Technology (PhD)
- Awards: MacArthur Fellowship, Sackler Prize
- Scientific career
- Fields: Organometallic Chemistry, Organic Chemistry, Catalysis
- Workplaces: University of Michigan
- Thesis: Synthetic and mechanistic investigations of ruthenium olefin metathesis catalysts (2001)
- Doctoral advisor: Robert H. Grubbs
- Other academic advisors: Robert H. Crabtree, John T. Groves

Melanie Sarah Sanford (born June 16, 1975) is an American chemist, currently the Moses Gomberg Distinguished University Professor of Chemistry and Arthur F. Thurnau Professor of Chemistry at the University of Michigan. She is a Fellow for the American Association for the Advancement of Science, and was elected a member of the National Academy of Sciences and the American Academy of Arts and Sciences in 2016. She has served as an executive editor of the Journal of the American Chemical Society since 2021, having been an associate editor of the since 2014.

== Life ==
Sanford was born and grew up in Providence, Rhode Island. She attended Classical High School. She graduated from Yale University with a BS and MS in chemistry in 1996, having carried out research with Robert H. Crabtree, while competing for the Yale Gymnastics NCAA team. She graduated from the California Institute of Technology with a Ph.D. in 2001, where she studied Chemistry with Robert H. Grubbs. She did postdoctoral work at Princeton University with John T. Groves.

Sanford began her academic career as an assistant professor at the University of Michigan in 2003. She was promoted to associate professor with tenure in 2007 and full professor in 2013.

== Research ==
Sanford is known for her studies of high-valent organopalladium species, particularly those implicated in Pd-catalyzed C–H functionalization reactions. Her group has also developed new methods to access fluorinated and radiofluorinated materials for agrochemicals, pharmaceuticals and radiology. In a collaboration with Matthew Sigman at the University of Utah, her group has designed new compounds for use in redox flow batteries.

== Awards and honors ==
Sanford has received numerous awards and honors including but not limited to:

- Herbert Newby McCoy Award for Graduate Research (2001)
- Camille and Henry Dreyfus Foundation New Faculty Award (2003)
- Beckman Young Investigators Award (2004)
- Boehringer Ingelheim New Investigator Award in Organic Synthesis (2005)
- Eli Lilly Grantee Award (2005)
- National Science Foundation Career Awards (2006)
- Research Corporation Cottrell Scholar Award (2006)
- AstraZeneca Excellence in Chemistry Award (2006)
- Presidential Early Career Award for Scientists and Engineers (2006)
- GlaxoSmithKline Chemistry Scholars Award (2006)
- Roche Excellence in Chemistry Award (2007)
- ACS Arthur C. Cope Scholar Award (2008)
- BASF Catalysis Award (2009)
- LSA Excellence in Teaching Award (2010)
- John Dewey Award for Undergraduate Education (2010)
- National Fresenius Award (2010)
- Arthur F. Thurnau Professorship (2011)
- ACS Award in Pure Chemistry (2011)
- Royal Society of Chemistry Fluorine Prize (2011)
- MacArthur Fellowship (2011)
- Classical High School Distinguished Alumni Award (2012)
- Moses Gomberg Collegiate Chair (2012)
- Thieme IUPAC Prize (2012)
- ACS Ipatieff Prize (2013)
- Tetrahedron Young Investigator Award in Synthetic Chemistry (2013)
- Sackler Prize in Chemistry (2013)
- ACS Sierra Nevada Section: Distinguished Chemist Award (2013)
- UM Faculty Recognition Award (2014)
- OMCOS Award (2015)
- SABIC Young Catalysis Investigator Award (2015)
- Elected Fellow, American Academy of Arts and Sciences (2016)
- Elected Member, National Academy of Sciences (2016)
- Distinguished University Professor (2016)
- ACS Fellow (2016)
- Blavatnik Award (2017)
- RSC Catalysis in Organic Chemistry Award(2020)
- ACS Award in Organometallic Chemistry(2021)

== Recent publications ==
1. Ferguson, D. M.; Bour, J. R.; Canty, A. J.; Kampf, J. W.; Sanford, M. S. "Aryl–CF_{3} Coupling from Phosphinoferrocene-Ligated Palladium(II) Complexes," Organometallics 2019, ASAP Article.
2. Lee, S. J.; Makaravage, K. J.; Brooks, A. F.; Scott, P. J. H.; Sanford, M. S. "Cu‐Mediated Aminoquinoline‐Directed Radiofluorination of Aromatic C–H Bonds with K^{18}F," Angew. Chem. Int. Ed. 2019, ASAP Article.
3. Yang, L.; Brooks, A. F.; Makaravage, K. J.; Zhang, H.; Sanford, M. S.; Scott, P. J. H.; Shao, X. "Radiosynthesis of [^{11}C]LY2795050 for Preclinical and Clinical PET Imaging Using Cu(II)-Mediated Cyanation," ACS Med. Chem. Lett. 2018, 9, 1274–1279.
4. Malapit, C. A.; Bour, J. R.; Brigham, C. E.; Sanford, M. S. "Base-free nickel-catalysed decarbonylative Suzuki–Miyaura coupling of acid fluorides," Nature 2018, 563, 100–104.
5. Aguilera, E. Y.; Sanford, M. S. "Model Complexes for the Palladium-Catalyzed Transannular C–H Functionalization of Alicyclic Amines," Organometallics 2018, 1, 138–142.
6. Mantell, M.; Kampf, J. W.; Sanford, M. S. "Improved Synthesis of [CpRRhCl_{2}]_{2} Complexes," Organometallics 2018, 37, 3240–3242.
7. Schimler, S. D.; Froese, R. D. J.; Bland, D. C.; Sanford, M. S. "Reactions of Arylsulfonate Electrophiles with NMe_{4}F: Mechanistic Insight, Reactivity, and Scope," J. Org. Chem. 2018 83, 11178–11190.
8. Cabrera, P. J.; Lee, M.; Sanford, M. S. "Second-Generation Palladium Catalyst System for Transannular C–H Functionalization of Azabicycloalkanes," J. Am. Chem. Soc. 2018, 140, 5599–5606.
9. Makaravage, K. J.; Shao, X.; Brooks, A. F.; Yang, L.; Sanford, M. S.; Scott, P. J. H. "Copper(II)-Mediated [^{11}C]Cyanation of Arylboronic Acids and Arylstannanes," Org. Lett. 2018, 20, 1530–1533.
10. Hendricks, K. H.; Robinson, S. G.; Braten, M. N.; Sevov, C. S.; Helms, B. A.; Sigman, M. S.; Minteer, S. D.; Sanford, M. S. "High-Performance Oligomeric Catholytes for Effective Macromolecular Separation in Nonaqueous Redox Flow Batteries," ACS Cent. Sci. 2018, 4, 189–196.
11. James, B. R.; Boissonnault, J. A.; Wong-Foy, A. G.; Matzger, A. J.; Sanford, M. S. "Structure activity relationships in metal–organic framework catalysts for the continuous flow synthesis of propylene carbonate from CO_{2} and propylene oxide," RSC Adv. 2018, 8, 2132–2137.
12. Topczewski, J. T.; Cabrera, P. J.; Saper, N. I.; Sanford, M. S. "Palladium-Catalysed Transannular C–H Functionalization of Alicyclic Amines," Nature 2016, 531, 220–224.
13. Cook, A. K.; Schimler, S. D.; Matzger, A. J.; Sanford, M. S. "Catalyst-Controlled Selectivity in the C–H Borylation of Methane and Ethane," Science 2016, 351, 1421–1424.
14. Camasso, N. M.; Sanford, M. S. "Design, Synthesis, and Carbon-Heteroatom Coupling Reactions of Organometallic Nickel (IV) Complexes," Science 2015, 347, 1218–1220.
15. Hickman, A. J.; Sanford, M. S. "High-Valent Organometallic Copper and Palladium in Catalysis," Nature 2012, 484, 177–185.
