= Molecular tweezers =

Molecules which bind other molecules

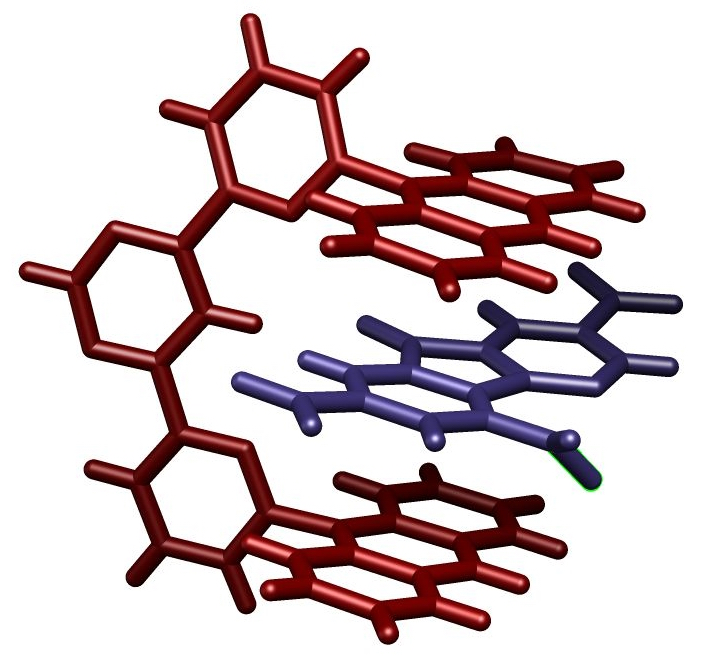
Figure 1. Trinitrofluorene bound in molecular tweezers reported by Lehn and coworkers.

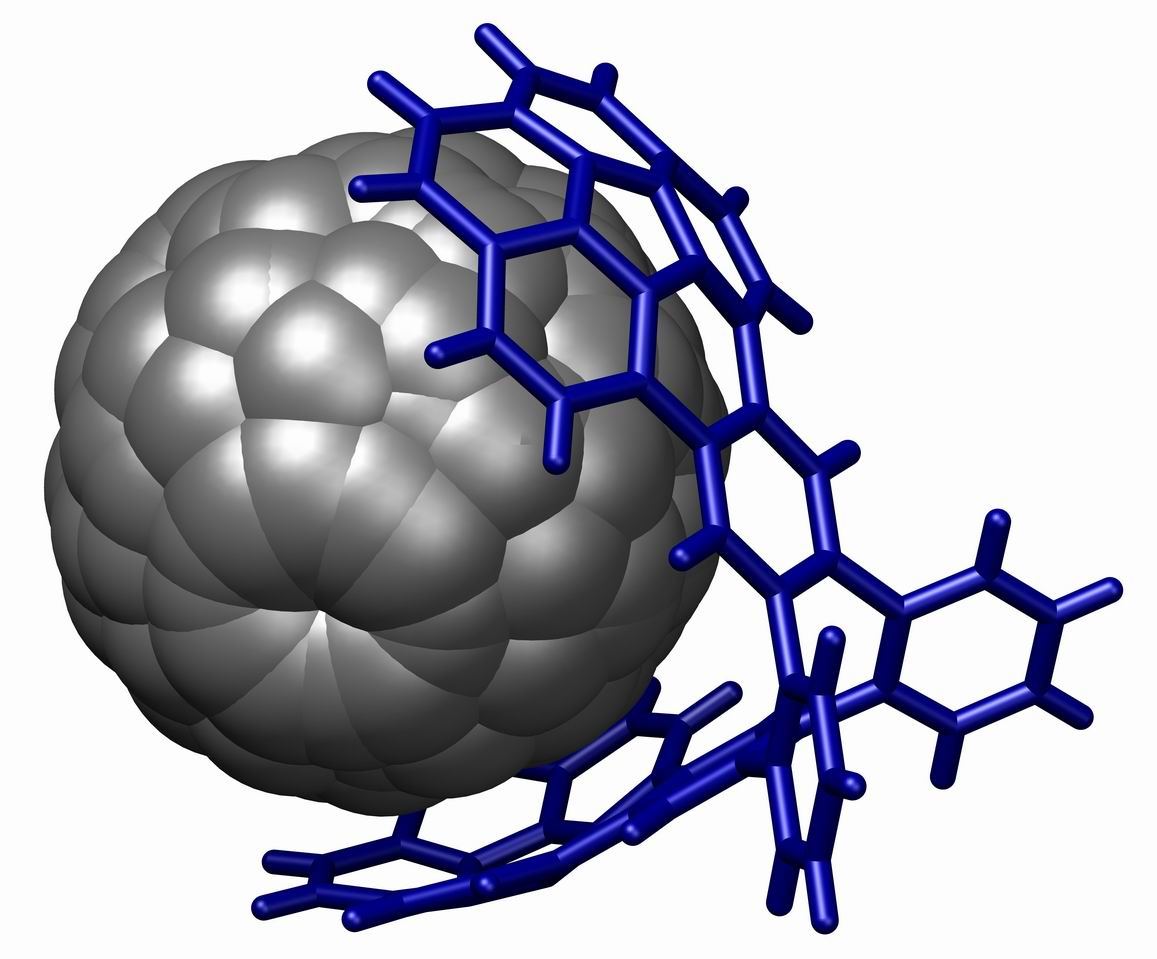
Figure 2. A fullerene bound in a buckycatcher through aromatic stacking interactions.

Molecular tweezers, and molecular clips, are host molecules with open cavities capable of binding guest molecules. The open cavity of the molecular tweezers may bind guests using non-covalent bonding, which includes hydrogen bonding, metal coordination, hydrophobic forces, van der Waals forces, π–π interactions, and/or electrostatic effects. These complexes are a subset of macrocyclic molecular receptors and their structure is that the two "arms" that bind the guest molecule between them are only connected at one end leading to a certain flexibility of these receptor molecules (induced fit model).

== History ==
The term "molecular tweezers" was first used by Whitlock. The class of hosts was developed and popularized by Zimmerman in the mid-1980s to early 1990s and later by Klärner.

== Examples ==
Some molecular tweezers bind aromatic guests. These molecular tweezers consist of a pair of anthracene arms held at a distance that allows aromatic guests to gain π–π interactions from both (see Figure). Other molecular tweezers feature a pair of tethered porphyrins.

Yet another type of molecular tweezers binds fullerenes. These "buckycatchers" are composed of two corannulene pincers that complement the surface of the convex fullerene guest (Figure 2). An association constant (K_{a}) of 8,600 M^{−1} was calculated using ^{1}H NMR spectroscopy.

Stoermer and co-workers described clefts capable of capturing cyclohexane or chloroform molecules. Intriguingly, pi interactions played key roles in guest capture as well as cleft formation rate.

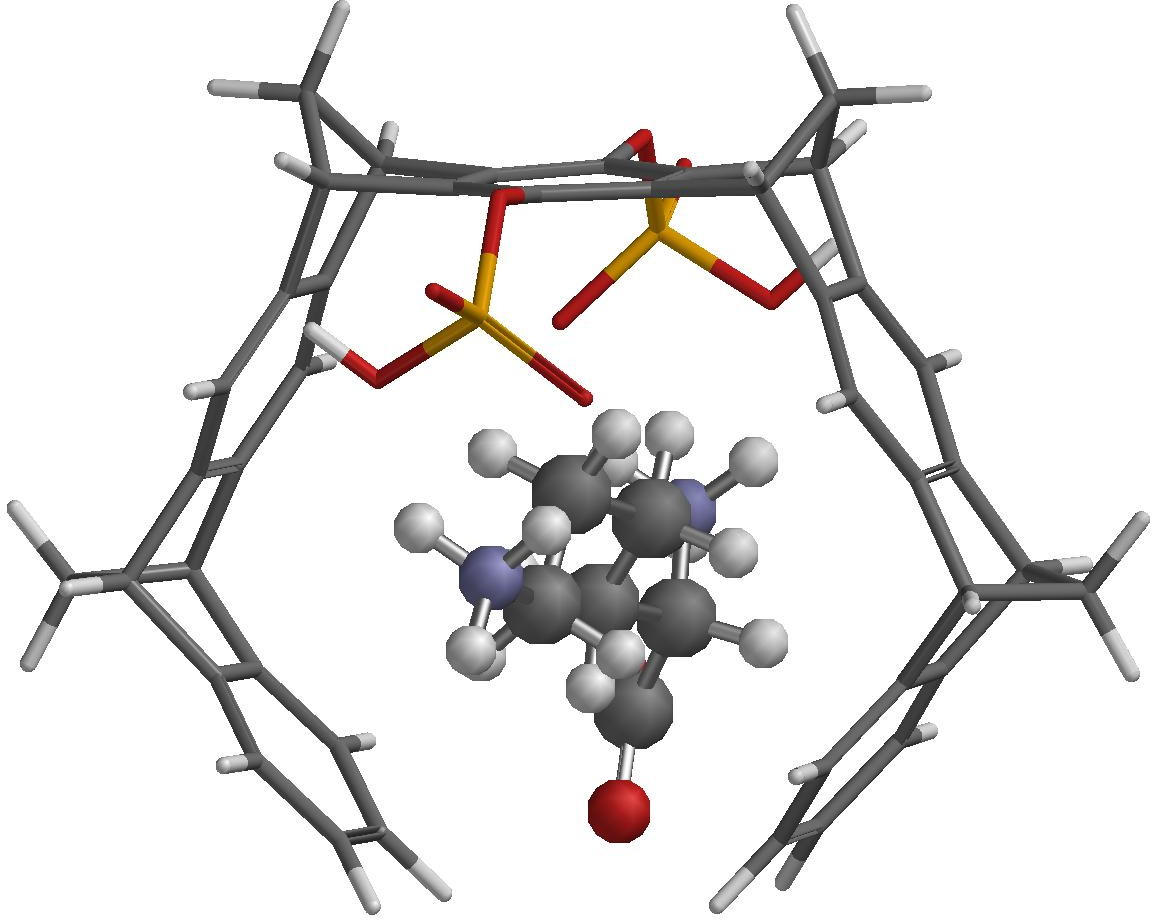
Figure 3. The aliphatic sidechain of lysine bound inside the cavity of the phosphate-substituted molecular benzene tweezer by electrostatic, CH-p and hydrophobic interactions reported by Klärner, Schrader, and coworkers.^{[9,10]}

Water-soluble phosphate-substituted molecular tweezers made of alternating phenyl and norbornenyl substituents bind to positively charged aliphatic side chains of basic amino acids, such as lysine and arginine (Figure 3). Similar compounds called "molecular clips", whose side walls are flat rather than convex, prefer to enclose flat pyridinium rings (for example the nicotinamide ring of NAD(P)+) between their plane naphthalene sidewalls (Figure 4). These mutually exclusive binding modes make these compounds valuable tools for probing critical biological interactions of basic amino acid side chains in peptides and proteins as well as of NAD(P)^{+} and similar cofactors. For example, both types of compounds inhibit the oxidation reactions of ethanol by alcohol dehydrogenase or of glucose-6-phosphate by glucose-6-phosphate dehydrogenase, respectively.

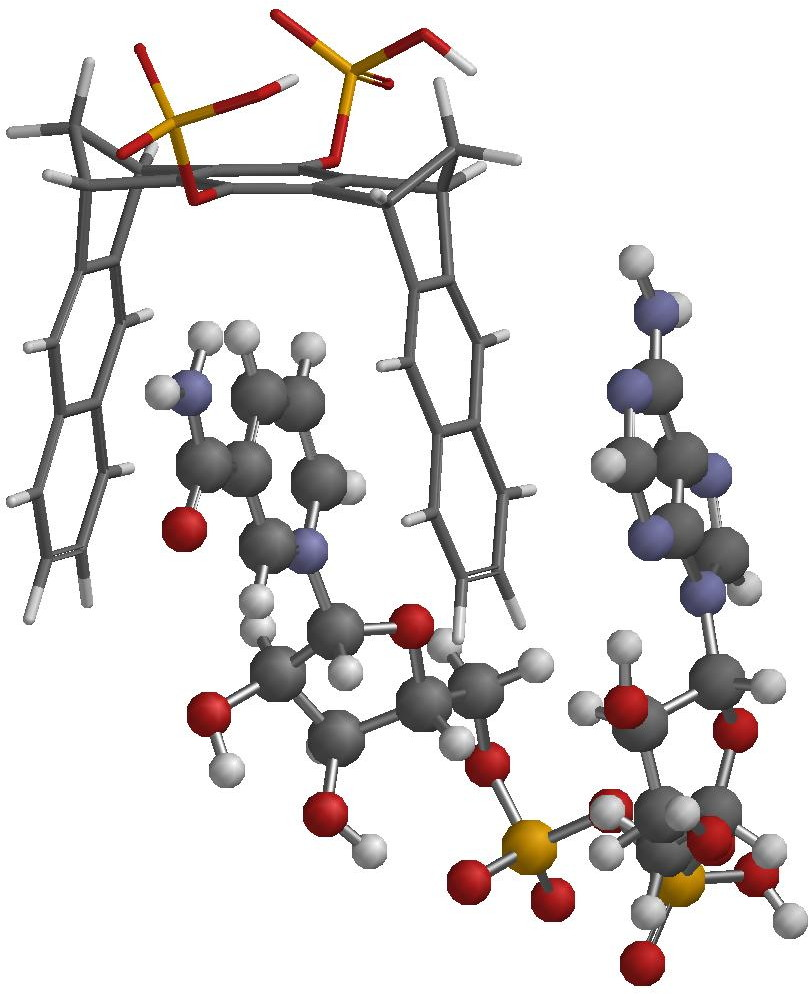
Figure 4. The double-sandwich host–guest complex of the phosphate-substituted molecular clip and nicotinamide adenine dinucleotide (NAD^{+}, the cofactor of many redox enzymes). The nicotinamide ring (the active site of NAD^{+}) is bound between the clip naphthalene sidewalls, as reported by Klärner, Schrader, Ochsenfeld, and coworkers.^{[11]}

The molecular tweezers, but not the clips, efficiently inhibit the formation of toxic oligomers and aggregates by amyloidogenic proteins associated with different diseases. Examples include the proteins involved in Alzheimer's disease – amyloid β-protein (Aβ) and tau; α-synuclein, which is thought to cause Parkinson's disease and other synucleinopathies and is involved in spinal-cord injury; mutant huntingtin, which causes Huntington's disease; islet amyloid polypeptide (amylin), which kills pancreatic β-cells in type-2 diabetes; transthyretin (TTR), which causes familial amyloid polyneuropathy, familial amyloid cardiomyopathy, and senile systemic amyloidosis; aggregation-prone mutants of the tumor-suppressor protein p53; and semen proteins whose aggregation enhances HIV infection. Importantly, the molecular tweezers have been found to be effective and safe not only in the test tube but also in animal models of different diseases, suggesting that they may be developed as drugs against diseases caused by abnormal protein aggregation, all of which currently have no cure. They were also shown to destroy the membranes of enveloped viruses, such as HIV, herpes, and hepatitis C, which makes them good candidates for development of microbicides.

The above examples show the potential reactivity and specificity of these molecules. The binding cavity between the side arms of the tweezer can evolve to bind to an appropriate guest with high specificity, depending on the configuration of the tweezer. That makes this overall class of macromolecule truly synthetic molecular receptors with important application to biology and medicine.

== See also ==
- Clathrate compound
- Host–guest chemistry
