= Martin F. Semmelhack =

American organic chemist

- Born: November 19, 1941 (age 84); Appleton, Wisconsin, U.S.
- Education: University of Wisconsin–Madison (BS); Harvard University (AM, PhD)
- Known for: Semmelhack reaction organonickel and arene–chromium chemistry quorum-sensing chemical biology
- Awards: Guggenheim Fellowship (1978–79); Arthur C. Cope Scholar Award (2013); President's Award for Distinguished Teaching (2018)
- Scientific career
- Fields: Organic chemistry, organometallic chemistry, chemical biology
- Institutions: Cornell University; Princeton University
- Doctoral advisor: E. J. Corey
- Other academic advisors: William Summer Johnson (postdoctoral)
- Notable students: Paul Knochel; Richmond Sarpong; William Wulff

Martin F. Semmelhack (born November 19, 1941) is an American organic chemist and Professor of Chemistry at Princeton University. His research career focuses on the application of transition metal chemistry to organic synthesis, developing new organonickel- and palladium-catalyzed methodology, including the palladium-catalyzed cyclization known as the Semmelhack reaction. He has also researched reactions of arene- and diene-metal complexes. In the later part of his career his research turned toward chemical biology, particularly the study of bacterial quorum sensing in collaboration with Princeton molecular biologist Bonnie Bassler.

According to fellow Princeton chemist David MacMillan, Semmelhack is "an elder statesman” of organometallic chemistry, recognized for "pushing chemical synthesis into conceptually novel areas."

== Early life and education ==
Semmelhack was born on November 19, 1941, in Appleton, Wisconsin, where he was raised. Developing an early enthusiasm for chemistry as a teenager, he periodically visited the stockroom of nearby Lawrence College to request chemicals—including concentrated sulfuric acid, supplied only with written permission from Semmelhack's mother—for experiments he conducted with borrowed glassware in his parents' basement.

He attended the University of Wisconsin–Madison from 1959 to 1963, earning a Bachelor of Science degree in chemistry, and worked as an undergraduate on organic photochemistry with Howard E. Zimmerman. A young member of the Wisconsin faculty, David M. Lemal, became a mentor and friend, advising Semmelhack to pursue doctoral study with a young colleague at Harvard whose work he described as "really exciting," E. J. Corey.

Following Lemal's advice, Semmelhack began doctoral study at Harvard University in the fall of 1963, joining Corey's group to work in the then-new field of organotransition-metal reagents applied to organic synthesis. He received an A.M. in 1965 and a Ph.D. in organic chemistry in 1967. He then held a National Institutes of Health postdoctoral fellowship at Stanford University under William Summer Johnson, where he took part in work completing the first total synthesis of a natural steroid using a biomimetic polyolefin cyclization strategy.

== Academic career ==
In the fall of 1968, Semmelhack joined the chemistry faculty of Cornell University as an assistant professor. He was promoted to associate professor in 1974 and to full professor in 1977. In 1978, he moved to Princeton University as professor of chemistry, a position he continues to hold as of 2026. He served as associate chair of the chemistry department from 1993 to 1996. As of 2023, he was still teaching Princeton's introductory organic chemistry sequence, working alongside colleague Erik Sorensen to adapt the course to changing student preparation and needs.

From 1988 to 1990, Semmelhack spent two years in industry, serving first as acting department head of the metabolic diseases section and then as consulting director of chemistry at the American Cyanamid Medical Research Division.

In 2018, his fortieth year at Princeton, Semmelhack received the university's President's Award for Distinguished Teaching. Since 2014, the chemistry department has held a lecture series, the Semmelhack Symposia, in his honor.

== Research ==
Across his career, Semmelhack's research has been characterized by the search for new reactivity, particularly in transition-metal-mediated processes, and its application to the synthesis of structurally complex or biologically active molecules.

=== Organometallic methodology ===
Semmelhack's contributions lie in the development and application of transition metal complexes—principally chromium, nickel, and palladium species—as reagents and catalysts in organic synthesis. Semmelhack systematically expanded the synthetic utility of arene–chromium tricarbonyl complexes, demonstrating that these complexes activate arene rings toward nucleophilic addition, enabling transformations that were previously inaccessible through classical methods.

His early investigations at Cornell into the reactivity of zerovalent nickel complexes with aryl and vinyl halides described nickel-mediated coupling processes and provided early preparative routes to polyarene natural products, including alnusone. In the early 1980s, a benzannulation reaction of carbene–chromium complexes became a research focus, including its first intramolecular example, applied in a synthesis of the naphthoquinone antibiotic deoxyfrenolicin.

In 2013, Stephen L. Buchwald of MIT praised Semmelhack's early recognition of transition metals' synthetic potential, calling Semmelhack "someone who was ahead of his time."

=== The Semmelhack reaction ===
In the course of his benzannulation work, Semmelhack discovered a method to simplify the deoxyfrenolicin synthesis using an intramolecular, palladium(II)-catalyzed alkoxycarbonylation. The method he went on to develop for building tetrahydrofuran and tetrahydropyran rings is today known as the Semmelhack reaction. In 1984, Semmelhack and Christina Bodurow applied this method to alcohols bearing pendant olefins: intramolecular oxypalladation forms a cyclic alkylpalladium intermediate that is carbonylated and then trapped, typically by methanol, to give a β-alkoxy ester, with the resulting Pd(0) reoxidized in situ by CuCl_{2} so that the reaction turns over catalytically in palladium. A companion paper the same year showed that, using stoichiometric Pd(OAc)_{2} and an internal alcohol nucleophile, intramolecular trapping of the intermediate acylpalladium species could instead construct two rings—a fused bicyclic lactone—in a single operation.

A 2021 tutorial review in Chemical Society Reviews discussed the Semmelhack reaction as one of a handful of palladium-catalyzed cascade cyclizations that have expedited complex natural product total synthesis, citing applications including Tang and Werness's synthesis of (−)-kumausallene, in which a gram-scale Semmelhack reaction served as the fourth step of the route, and Tang, Chen, and Yang's synthesis of (±)-schindilactone A, in which the reaction was instead used late-stage, on a fully elaborated pentacyclic intermediate, to forge two of the natural product's eight rings.

=== Spiroconjugation ===
Semmelhack's group at Cornell prepared spiro[4.4]nonatetraene, providing one of the first experimental test cases for spiroconjugation—the through-space electronic interaction between two π systems joined at a common sp^{3}-hybridized spiro carbon.

=== TEMPO oxidation and electrocatalysis ===
Semmelhack developed TEMPO as a reagent for selective oxidation of primary alcohols to aldehydes. Subsequent work showed that TEMPO functions as a mediator for the electrooxidation of primary amines. By running this reaction under aqueous conditions, primary amines were converted to aldehydes, while under anhydrous conditions they were converted to nitriles. In related work, the selective TEMPO oxidation reaction was shown to work selectively with Cu(II) as a catalyst and oxygen as the stoichiometric oxidant. This process was refined and generalized by Shannon Stahl and is known as the Stahl Oxidation.

Semmelhack also developed electrochemical methods for organic synthesis, including protocols for selective protecting-group removal by electro-reduction.

=== Quorum sensing and chemical biology ===
In the later part of his career, in collaboration with Princeton molecular biologist Bonnie Bassler and others, his group has focused on the phenomenon of quorum sensing, a form of bacterial cell-to-cell communication mediated by diffusible small-molecule signaling compounds known as autoinducers. In addition to characterizing and synthesizing the natural signals, Semmelhack's group designed, synthesized, and evaluated small-molecule agonists and antagonists as chemical probes of the quorum-sensing circuits of human pathogens including Vibrio cholerae, Pseudomonas aeruginosa, and Staphylococcus aureus. These molecules have been studied as potential anti-virulence therapeutics that act without directly killing the bacteria, an approach intended to reduce the selective pressure that drives antibiotic resistance.

== Professional service ==
Semmelhack has served on the editorial or advisory boards of the Journal of Organic Chemistry, Organometallics, Organic Reactions, and Organic Syntheses. Within the American Chemical Society, he served on the Executive Committee of the Division of Organic Chemistry and was chair of the division in 1988.

== Honors and awards ==
- National Science Foundation Graduate Fellowship (1964–1967)
- National Institutes of Health Postdoctoral Fellowship (1967–1968)
- Camille Dreyfus Teacher-Scholar Award (1972–1977)
- Alfred P. Sloan Foundation Fellowship (1972–1975)
- Guggenheim Fellowship (1978–1979)
- Arthur C. Cope Scholar Award, American Chemical Society (2013)
- President's Award for Distinguished Teaching, Princeton University (2018)
