= Steven Zimmerman =

Steven C. Zimmerman
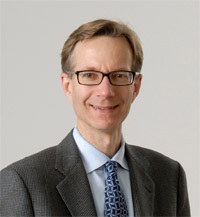
- Steven C. Zimmerman
- Born: 1957 (age 68–69); Chicago, Illinois, US
- Education: Columbia University; University of Wisconsin
- Scientific career
- Fields: Organic chemistry
- Workplaces: University of Illinois
- Thesis: β-eliminations and the asymmetric synthesis of amino acids by pyridoxamine enzyme analogues utilizing general base-acid catalysis (1984)
- Doctoral advisor: Ronald Breslow

Steven Charles Zimmerman (born 1957) is an American organic chemist who is a professor in the Department of Chemistry at the University of Illinois at Urbana-Champaign.

== Early life ==
He was born in Chicago in 1957, the second son of organic chemist Howard Zimmerman. He attended public schools in Madison, Wisconsin where he received a B.S. degree in 1979 working for Hans J. Reich. In 1983 he received a Ph.D. at Columbia University in New York City where he worked with Ronald Breslow on pyridoxamine enzyme analogs.

== Career ==
After an NSF-NATO Postdoctoral Fellowship at the University of Cambridge with Sir Alan R. Battersby, he joined the faculty at the University of Illinois (1985).

He was appointed the Roger Adams Professor of Chemistry at the University of Illinois at Urbana-Champaign in 2004, having previously held a William H. and Janet G. Lycan Professorship.

=== Administrator ===
Zimmerman served as the Head of the University of Illinois Department of Chemistry from 1999 to 2000 and 2005 to 2012.

As Department Head he managed an academic staff of 115 full-time equivalents (FTE) with a State budget of $8.4 M and total expenditures of $26.7M, including federal research grants and contracts.

He oversaw a $60M fundraising campaign and secured the three largest individual gifts (>$15M total) at the University of Illinois in academic year 2007. He negotiated and oversaw a cooperative agreement to port the University of Illinois Department of Chemistry undergraduate curriculum to the Hanoi University of Science in Vietnam, increased standards for graduate enrollment, and increased the diversity of the faculty, staff, and student body.

=== Research ===
His early research was focused on molecular recognition, models of serine proteases, and topologically novel DNA intercalators.

He and his coworkers pioneered the development of a new class of nonmacrocyclic molecular hosts called molecular tweezers, also called more recently, molecular clips.

His current work focuses on dendrimers, including their supramolecular chemistry and the supramolecular chemistry of other polymers (supramolecular polymer chemistry).

== Awards and achievements ==
- Fellow, American Association for the Advancement of Science
- Arthur C. Cope Scholar Award, American Chemical Society
- Buck-Whitney Award, Eastern New York Section of American Chemical Society
- Presidential Young Investigator Award, National Science Foundation
- Alfred P. Sloan Fellowship
- Camille and Henry Dreyfus Teacher-Scholar Award
- Cyanamid Academic Award
- Eli Lilly Grantee
- American Cancer Society Junior Faculty Award
