= Paul Knochel =

French chemist (born 1955)

Paul Knochel (born 15 November 1955) is a French chemist and a member of the French Academy of Sciences.

== Biography ==
Paul Knochel was born in Strasbourg. He studied chemistry at the university technical institute (IUT) in Strasbourg, then at the ENSCS (École Nationale Supérieure de Chimie de Strasbourg). From 1979 to 1982, he completed his thesis entitled "Nitroallyl-halogenide und -ester als effiziente Verknüpfungsreagenzien" at ETH Zurich (Switzerland) in the group of Dieter Seebach. He then spent four years at the French National Centre for Scientific Research (CNRS) at the Pierre et Marie Curie University in Paris in the group of Jean-François Normant. During this period, he studied carbozincation reactions using allylic reagents and prepared bimetallic compounds bearing two different metals (Lithium, Magnesium or Zinc) on the same carbon atom. He then joined Martin F. Semmelhack's laboratory for a post-doctoral fellowship during which he worked on the use of indoles-chromium complexes in organic synthesis. In 1987, he accepted a position as Assistant Professor in the Department of Chemistry at the University of Michigan at Ann Arbor (MI, USA) where he developed the first methods for the preparation of polyfunctional organometallic zinc species. In 1991, he was promoted to Professor at the same university before moving to Marburg University (Germany) in 1992, where he was offered a position as Professor of Organic Chemistry in the Department of Chemistry at Marburg University. He continued his work on the chemistry of polyfunctional organozinciques and their use in asymmetric synthesis. In 1999, he was offered a position as Professor of Organic Chemistry at LMU Munich which he still holds in 2019. He has developed new methods for the preparation of polyfunctional organometallic species as well as numerous synthetic methods using organometallic reagents or catalysts.

== Scientific work ==
Knochel has developed a series of new methods for the preparation of polyfunctional organometallic species of zinc and magnesium, but also many other metals such as copper, aluminium, manganese, indium, iron, lanthanum and samarium. In addition, he highlighted the fact that lithium salts catalyse a significant number of organometallic reactions, including the oxidative addition of a metal such as magnesium, zinc, indium, manganese or aluminium to an organic halide. It has shown that the use of lithium derivatives (chloride, acetylacetonates or alcoholates) catalyses the halogen-metal exchange in the preparation of organomagnesians and organozinciques. In addition, it has synthesized a series of new cluttered metal bases derived from tetramethylpiperidine allowing C-H activations of aromatic and heterocyclic unsaturated systems. He has also conducted research on a series of diastereoselective mixed coupling reactions catalyzed by palladium, iron, cobalt and chromium. He has succeeded in considerably increasing the scope of these organic synthesis reactions through continuous flow chemistry. It has also implemented a synthetic methodology for the preparation of lithians, zinciques and organocuprates with high enantioselectivity and has demonstrated the usefulness of this method for preparing pheromones containing up to five chiral centres. By using additives such as zinc or magnesium pivalate, it has been possible to prepare organozinciques with high stability against air and moisture.

== Honours and awards ==
- Berthelot Medal of the French Academy of Sciences (Paris) 1992
- IUPAC Thieme Prize 1994
- ECS – European Chemical Society – Chiroscience Award for Creative European Chemistry 1995
- Otto Bayer Award 1995
- Leibniz Prize 1996
- Merck Sharp & Dohme Research Award 2000/2001
- V. Grignard Prize 2000
- Dr. Paul Janssen Prize for Creativity in Organic Synthesis 2004
- Cope Scholar Award of the American Chemical Society 2005
- Lilly European Distinguished Lectureship Award 2007
- Member of the French Academy of Sciences (Paris) 2007
- Member of the Bavarian Academy of Science 2008
- Karl-Ziegler-Preis 2009
- Member of the German Academy of Sciences Leopoldina 2009
- EROS (Encyclopedia of Reagents for Organic Synthesis) Best Reagent Award. 2011
- Gold Nagoya Medal of Organic Chemistry 2012
- Chevalier dans l'Ordre national du Mérite 2013
- Herbert C. Brown Award for Creative Research in Synthetic Methods 2014
