= Uday Maitra =

Indian chemist

- Born: Durgapur, West Bengal, India
- Education: University of Calcutta; Columbia University; University of California, Berkeley
- Known for: Studies on molecular tools and supramolecular assemblies
- Awards: 2001 Shanti Swarup Bhatnagar Prize
- Scientific career
- Fields: Supramolecular chemistry
- Workplaces: Indian Institute of Science
- Thesis: I. Selective aqueous Diels-Alder reactions / II. Template directed β-face functionalization and sidechain removal of steroids (1986)
- Doctoral advisor: Ronald Breslow; Paul A. Bartlett

Uday Maitra is an Indian organic chemist and a professor in the department of organic chemistry at the Indian Institute of Science. He is known for his studies on molecular tools and supramolecular assemblies. He is a recipient of the Shanti Swarup Bhatnagar Prize for Science and Technology, one of the highest Indian science awards.

== Biography ==
Born in Durgapur, Maitra secured B.Sc. in Chemistry from Presidency College(then affiliated to University of Calcutta) and PhD in 1986 from Columbia University, working under the guidance of Ronald Breslow and did his post-doctoral studies at the laboratory of Paul A. Bartlett of the University of California, Berkeley. His studies are characterized by the new methodologies he employed in developing supramolecular assemblies and molecular tools like receptors, tweezers and gelators. He has published his researches in a number of peer-reviewed articles; ResearchGate, an online repository of scientific articles has listed 142 of them. He has mentored many doctoral scholars and is involved in initiatives for the popularization of chemistry. He has participated in seminars to deliver plenary/invited addresses, was a member of the Indian delegation at the Indo-German Symposium on Frontiers of Chemistry organized by the Indian Institute of Technology, Kanpur and is a member of the editorial board of the Asian Journal of Organic Chemistry. The Council of Scientific and Industrial Research, the apex agency of the Government of India for scientific research, awarded him the Shanti Swarup Bhatnagar Prize for Science and Technology, one of the highest Indian science awards, in 2001, for his contributions to chemical sciences.

He is currently the Chair of the IUPAC Committee on Chemistry Education and is an IUPAC Science Board member.
