= Francis William Bergstrom =

American professor of chemistry

Francis William Bergstrom, Ph.D. (1897–1946) was an American professor of chemistry at Stanford University.

Bergstrom was born in Bloomington, Indiana, on January 10, 1897, then moved to Stanford when he was 11 years old. He enrolled at Stanford and received a B.S. in 1918 and a Ph.D. in 1922, working with Edward Curtis Franklin. His postdoctoral work was undertaken at Clark University and Brown University, working with Charles A. Kraus. His independent career lasted 29 years at Stanford, during which time he wrote 70 peer-reviewed papers on nitrogen chemistry and served as an associate editor for The Journal of Organic Chemistry.

Bergstrom died of a fast-moving brain tumor when he was 49 years of age. A memorial professorship, held currently by Paul Wender, bears his name.

== Awards and honors ==
- 1934 - Guggenheim Fellowship
- 1922-1925 - National Research Council (United States) postdoctoral fellow
