= John T. Groves =

American chemist

- Born: United States
- Education: Columbia University, Massachusetts Institute of Technology
- Known for: Oxygen rebound mechanism
- Scientific career
- Fields: Chemistry
- Workplaces: Princeton University
- Doctoral advisor: Ronald Breslow

John T. Groves is an American chemist, and Hugh Stott Taylor Chair of Chemistry, at Princeton University.

== Biography ==
Groves received an undergraduate degree in chemistry at Massachusetts Institute of Technology, where he worked with Frederick Greene. In 1965, he began his doctoral studies under the direction of Professor Ronald Breslow at the Columbia University. During this time, he focused on the synthesis and characterization of cyclopropenyl cation, the simplest aromatic system and the first aromatic compound prepared with other than six electrons in a ring.

Upon receiving his Ph.D., Groves began his independent research career as a member of the chemistry faculty at the University of Michigan, Ann Arbor in 1969. In 1985, he moved to Princeton University where he is Hugh Stott Taylor Chair of Chemistry.

The major thrust of his research program is at the interface of organic, inorganic, and biological chemistry. Recent efforts have focused on the design of new, biomimetic catalysts and the molecular mechanisms of metal-catalyzed redox processes, the design and assembly of large scale membrane-protein-small molecule constructs, strategies for the assembly of biogenic hard materials, molecular probes of peroxynitrite-mediated protein nitration, pharmaceutical strategies for protection against peroxynitrite-mediated pathologies, and mechanisms by which pathogens acquire metabolic iron from host cells.

Groves's many awards include: A. C. Cope Scholar Award (1989), Alfred Bader Award in Bioorganic and Bioinorganic Chemistry (1996), National Science Foundation Extension Award for Special Creativity, (2008-2011), Frontiers in Biological Chemistry Award (2009), and ACS Ira Remsen Award (2010). He is a member of the National Academy of Sciences, the American Academy of Arts and Sciences. He is also a foreign member of the Royal Society.

He is on the Management Committee, of the Center for Catalytic Hydrocarbon Functionalization, at the University of Virginia.

== Oxygen rebound mechanism ==
Cytochrome P-450 and other oxygenase enzymes catalyze a diversity of oxidations, including hydroxylation of hydrocarbons. In 1976, Groves and coworkers proposed the oxygen rebound mechanism to explain the observations. The central idea is that hydroxylation proceeds, not by direct insertion of O into a C-H bond, but rather by abstraction of H from the hydrocarbon to generate a reactive metal-hydroxide, which subsequently recombines (or rebounds) with the organic radical.

== Metalloporphyrins as P450 model compounds ==
In 1978, Groves and his collaborators reported the first catalytic alkane hydroxylation and alkene epoxidation catalyzed by a synthetic iron(III) porphyrin complex, Fe(TPP)Cl using an iodosylbenzene (PhIO) oxidant. In the reactions, alkenes and alkanes were oxidized to the corresponding epoxides and alcohols, respectively. The first use of a chiral iron porphyrin to carry out asymmetric epoxidation was reported in 1983 by Groves and Myers. Various substituted styrenes and aliphatic olefins were epoxidized with ee varying between 0% for 1-methylcyclohexene oxide and 51% for pchlorostyrene oxide. The ee was improved to ~70% for epoxidation of cis-β-methylstyrene with a robust chiral vaulted binaphthyl porphyrin.

In 1980, Groves reported the first manganese porphyrin catalyzed hydrocarbon oxidation reaction, using a Mn(TPP)Cl catalyst. In that study, oxidation of cyclohexane with iodosylbenzene catalyzed by Mn(TPP)Cl afforded a 2.5 : 1 mixture of cyclohexanol and cyclohexyl chloride in a total 70% yield. Oxidation of a radical clock substrate, norcarane, produced significant amounts of radical rearranged products, suggesting the presence of a long-lived free alkyl radical.
