= Jennifer Love (chemist) =

American chemist

Jennifer Ann Love
- Education: Allegheny College; Stanford University
- Scientific career
- Workplaces: University of Calgary; University of British Columbia
- Thesis: The design and development of a new reaction: rhodium-catalyzed 5+2 cycloadditions (2000)

Jennifer Ann Love is an American professor of chemistry at the University of Calgary. She is a Fellow of the Chemical Institute of Canada.

== Early life and education ==
Love was born in New England. She grew up in Rochester, New York. Love realized she was interested in science whilst at high school, but it was not until the second year of college that she realized her favourite science was chemistry. She was an undergraduate student at Allegheny College, and graduated magna cum laude. She moved to Stanford University for graduate studies, where she studied metal-catalyzed reactions to generate seven membered rings. Her thesis considered rhodium-catalysed cycloadditions, and was amongst the first studies to create a biologically active natural product. At Stanford, Love worked in the laboratory of Paul Wender.

== Research and career ==
Love joined the California Institute of Technology as National Institutes of Health postdoctoral fellow with Robert H. Grubbs. She studied the reaction mechanism for olefin metathesis.

In 2003, Love moved to Canada to start her independent scientific career at the University of British Columbia. At UBC, Love led a research group on organometallic chemistry. She also served as Senior Advisor on Women Faculty.

Love moved to the University of Calgary in 2019, where her work focuses on how the metallic center influences the reactivity.

== Awards and honors ==
- 2008 AstraZeneca Canada Award
- 2018 Intellisyn Pharma Award
- 2021 Elected Fellow of the Chemical Institute of Canada

== Selected publications ==
- Sanford MS; Love JA; Grubbs RH (July 1, 2001). "Mechanism and activity of ruthenium olefin metathesis catalysts". Journal of the American Chemical Society. 123 (27): 6543–6554. doi:10.1021/ja010624k. ISSN 0002-7863. PMID 11439041. Wikidata Q46357398.
- Jennifer A. Love; John P. Morgan; Tina M. Trnka; Robert H. Grubbs (November 1, 2002). "A Practical and Highly Active Ruthenium-Based Catalyst that Effects the Cross Metathesis of Acrylonitrile". Angewandte Chemie. 41 (21): 4035–4037. doi:10.1002/1521-3773(20021104)41:21<4035::aid-anie4035>3.0.co;2-i. ISSN 0044-8249. PMID 12412073. Wikidata Q44202097.
- Jennifer A Love; Melanie S. Sanford; Michael W Day; Robert H Grubbs (August 1, 2003). "Synthesis, structure, and activity of enhanced initiators for olefin metathesis". Journal of the American Chemical Society. 125 (33): 10103–10109. doi:10.1021/ja027472t. ISSN 0002-7863. PMID 12914474. Wikidata Q44546601.

== Personal life ==
Love is married to Pierre Kennepohl, a chemist at the University of Calgary. She spends her free time kayaking.
