= Merle Battiste =

American chemist

Merle A. Battiste
- Born: July 22, 1933; Mobile, Alabama, U.S.
- Died: August 8, 2009 (aged 76); Gainesville, Florida, U.S.
- Education: The Citadel (B.S); Louisiana State University (M.S); Columbia University (Ph.D, 1959)
- Spouse: Jan
- Scientific career
- Fields: Organic chemistry
- Workplaces: University of Florida
- Doctoral advisor: Ronald Breslow
- Notable students: Robert H. Grubbs

Merle A. Battiste (July 22, 1933 – August 8, 2009) was an American chemist and emeritus professor of chemistry at the University of Florida.

== Early life and education ==
Battiste was born on July 22, 1933, in Mobile, Alabama. His parents were David Theodore Battiste (1895-1987) and Flossie Mae Battiste (nee Older) (1897-1957). Battiste was the youngest of four siblings: one which died at infancy (1917-1917), Marion Theodore Battiste (1918-1988), James Melvin Battiste (Mildred), and Marie Wilson. He attended Murphy High School.

Battiste received a B.S. degree from The Citadel, Military College of South Carolina, an M.S. degree in organic chemistry from Louisiana State University at Baton Rouge, under Prof. J. G. Traynham, and a Ph.D. in organic chemistry from Columbia University in 1959. He was Ronald Breslow’s first Ph.D. student.

== Career ==
After conducting postdoctoral research (1960) with Saul Winstein at the University of California, Los Angeles, and after a short stint in the army, he joined the faculty at the University of Florida where he remained as a professor of organic chemistry for 42 years, until his retirement in 2004.

Battiste's research focused on the synthesis of novel molecular structures. He published over 130 peer-reviewed papers in organic chemistry and was known as a dedicated, passionate teacher.

As a passionate teacher, he convinced one of his research assistants, future Nobel Laureate Robert H. Grubbs, to study organic chemistry rather than agriculture science.

== Personal life ==
Battiste died at his home Gainesville, Florida, on August 8, 2009. Battiste loved gardening and he was member of the Gainesville Camellia Society for many years.

== Awards and honors ==
Battiste was a Sloan Fellow, a Fulbright Research Scholar, and an Erskine Fellow. He was also an emeritus member of American Chemical Society, joining in 1959. The University of Florida created the Battiste Award in Synthetic Chemistry. Originally established in 2005 as the Petra Award for Creative Work in Synthetic Organic Chemistry, the award name was changed in 2007 to honor Professor Battiste.

== Memberships ==
- 1959: American Chemical Society
- Fulbright Research Scholar
- Erskine Fellow
