= William Wulff =

American chemist (born 1949)

William D. Wulff
- Born: December 10, 1939; Eau Claire, Wisconsin, U.S.
- Education: University of Wisconsin - Eau Claire (BS), Iowa State University(PhD), Princeton University(Postdoctoral researcher)
- Occupations: Chemist and college professor
- Spouse: Mary Domenica Zaccari (m. 1974)
- Children: 3

William D. Wulff (born 1949) is an American chemist, currently at Michigan State University and an Elected Fellow of the American Association for the Advancement of Science. Wulff’s research focuses on asymmetric organocatalysis, Fischer carbene chemistry, mechanistic studies, and the total synthesis of natural products.

He earned his Ph.D. in organic chemistry from Iowa State University in 1979. Following this, he was a postdoctoral fellow at Princeton University from 1979 to 1980 under Professor M.F. Semmelhack. Before joining Michigan State, Wulff was a faculty member at the University of Chicago, serving as Assistant, Associate, and then full Professor between 1980 and 1999.

The Wulff–Dötz reaction named after him was first discovered by Karl Heinz Dötz and extensively developed by Dötz's and Wulff's groups.
