= Ceric ammonium nitrate =

Ammonium cerium(IV) nitrate
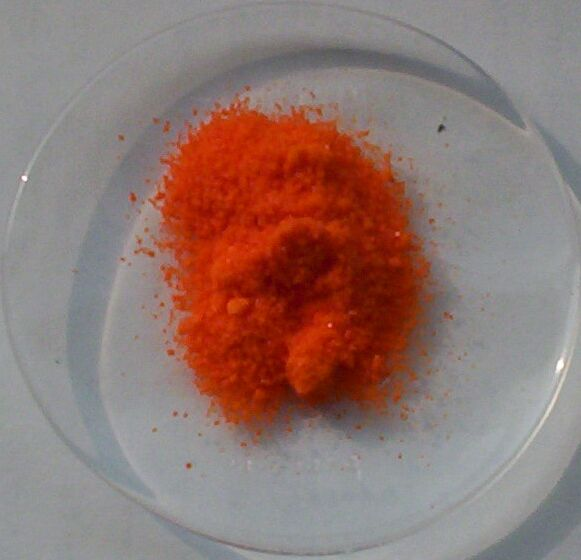
- Ammonium cerium(IV) nitrate

Names
- IUPAC name Diammonium cerium(IV) nitrate
- Other names Ceric ammonium nitrate CAN; Diammonium hexanitratocerate(IV)

Identifiers
CAS Number	16774-21-3
3D model (JSmol)	Interactive image
ChemSpider	157072
ECHA InfoCard	100.037.100
EC Number	240-827-6
PubChem CID	180504
UNII	U99S55ED6B
CompTox Dashboard (EPA)	DTXSID00893439
- InChI: InChI=1S/Ce.6NO3.2H3N/c;6*2-1(3)4;;/h;;;;;;;2*1H3/q+4;6*-1;;/p+2 Key: XMPZTFVPEKAKFH-UHFFFAOYSA-P; InChI=1/Ce.6NO3.2H3N/c;6*2-1(3)4;;/h;;;;;;;2*1H3/q+4;6*-1;;/p+2 Key: XMPZTFVPEKAKFH-SKRXCDHZAV
- SMILES: [Ce+4].O=[N+]([O-])[O-].[O-][N+]([O-])=O.[O-][N+]([O-])=O.[O-][N+]([O-])=O.[O-][N+]([O-])=O.[O-][N+]([O-])=O.[NH4+].[NH4+]

Properties
Chemical formula	[NH_{4}]_{2}[Ce(NO_{3})_{6}]
Molar mass	548.218 g·mol^{−1}
Appearance	orange-red crystals
Melting point	107 to 108 °C (225 to 226 °F; 380 to 381 K)
Solubility in water	141 g/100 mL (25 °C); 227 g/100 mL (80 °C)

Structure
Crystal structure	Monoclinic
Coordination geometry	Icosahedral

Hazards
- GHS labelling
Pictograms	(GHS03: Oxidizing) (GHS07: Exclamation mark)
Signal word	Danger
Hazard statements	H272, H302, H315, H319, H335
Precautionary statements	P220, P261, P305+P351+P338

Related compounds
Related compounds	Ammonium nitrate Cerium(IV) oxide
- Except where otherwise noted, data are given for materials in their standard state (at 25 °C [77 °F], 100 kPa). Infobox references

Ceric ammonium nitrate (CAN) is the inorganic compound with the formula (NH_{4})_{2}[Ce(NO_{3})_{6}]. This orange-red, water-soluble cerium salt is a specialised oxidizing agent in organic synthesis and a standard oxidant in quantitative analysis.

== Preparation, properties, and structure ==
The anion [Ce(NO_{3})_{6}]^{2−} is generated by dissolving Ce_{2}O_{3} in hot and concentrated nitric acid (HNO_{3}).

The salt consists of the hexanitratocerate(IV) anion [Ce(NO_{3})_{6}]^{2−} and a pair of ammonium cations NH^{+}_{4}. The ammonium ions are not involved in the oxidising reactions of this salt. In the anion each nitrate group chelates the cerium atom in a bidentate manner as shown below:

Hexanitratocerate anion

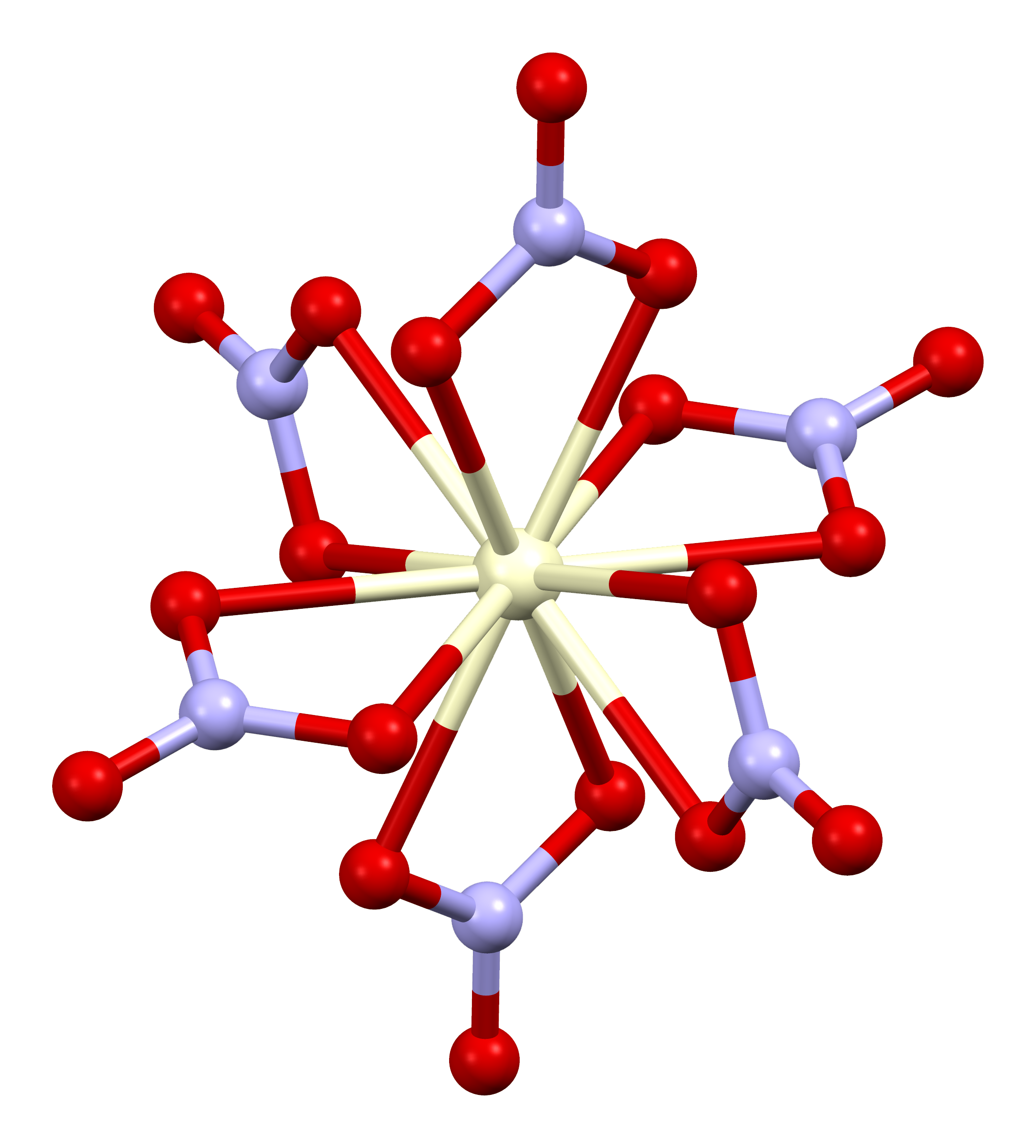
Ball-and-stick model

The anion [Ce(NO_{3})_{6}]^{2−} has T_{h} (idealized O_{h}) molecular symmetry. The CeO_{12} core defines an icosahedron.

Ce^{4+} is a strong one-electron oxidizing agent. In terms of its redox potential (E° ≈ 1.61 V vs. N.H.E.) it is an even stronger oxidizing agent than Cl_{2} (E° ≈ 1.36 V). Few shelf-stable reagents are stronger oxidants. In the redox process Ce(IV) is converted to Ce(III), a one-electron change, signaled by the fading of the solution color from orange to a pale yellow (providing that the substrate and product are not strongly colored).

== Applications in organic chemistry ==
In organic synthesis, CAN is useful as an oxidant for many functional groups (alcohols, phenols, and ethers) as well as C–H bonds, especially those that are benzylic. Alkenes undergo dinitroxylation, although the outcome is solvent-dependent. Quinones are produced from catechols and hydroquinones and even nitroalkanes are oxidized.

CAN provides an alternative to the Nef reaction; for example, for ketomacrolide synthesis where complicating side reactions usually encountered using other reagents. Oxidative halogenation can be promoted by CAN as an in situ oxidant for benzylic bromination, and the iodination of ketones and uracil derivatives.

=== For the synthesis of heterocycles ===
Catalytic amounts of aqueous CAN allow the efficient synthesis of quinoxaline derivatives. Quinoxalines are known for their applications as dyes, organic semiconductors, and DNA cleaving agents. These derivatives are also components in antibiotics such as echinomycin and actinomycin. The CAN-catalyzed three-component reaction between anilines and alkyl vinyl ethers provides an efficient entry into 2-methyl-1,2,3,4-tetrahydroquinolines and the corresponding quinolines obtained by their aromatization.

=== As a deprotection reagent ===
CAN is traditionally used to release organic ligands from metal carbonyls. In the process, the metal is oxidised, CO is evolved, and the organic ligand is released for further manipulation. For example, with the Wulff–Dötz reaction an alkyne, carbon monoxide, and a chromium carbene are combined to form a chromium half-sandwich complex and the phenol ligand can be isolated by mild CAN oxidation.

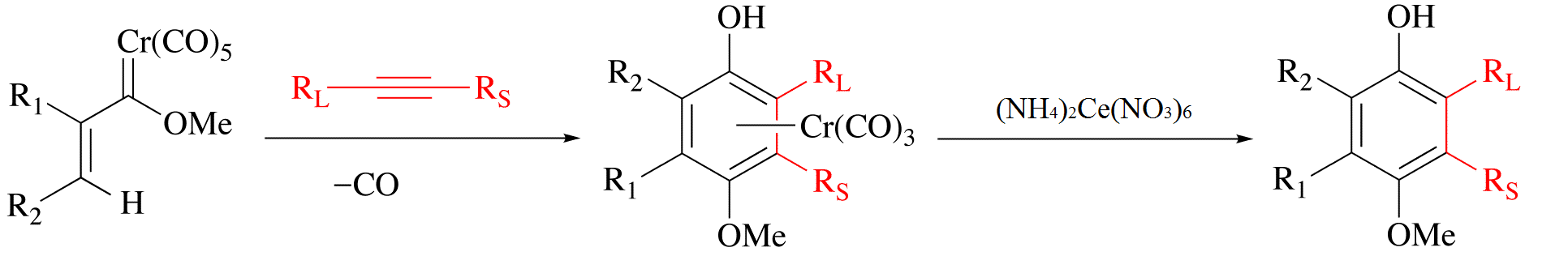

CAN is used to cleave para-methoxybenzyl and 3,4-dimethoxybenzyl ethers, which are protecting groups for alcohols. Two equivalents of CAN are required for each equivalent of para-methoxybenzyl ether. The alcohol is released, and the para-methoxybenzyl ether converts to para-methoxybenzaldehyde. The balanced equation is as follows:

2 [NH_{4}]_{2}[Ce(NO_{3})_{6}] + H_{3}COC_{6}H_{4}CH_{2}OR + H_{2}O → 4 NH^{+}_{4} + 2 Ce^{3+} + 12 NO^{−}_{3} + 2 H^{+} + H_{3}COC_{6}H_{4}CHO + HOR

== Other applications ==
CAN is also a component of chrome etchant, a material that is used in the production of photomasks and liquid crystal displays. It is also an effective nitration reagent, especially for the nitration of aromatic ring systems. In acetonitrile, CAN reacts with anisole to obtain ortho-nitration products.
