= Ronald Breslow =

American chemist (1931–2017)

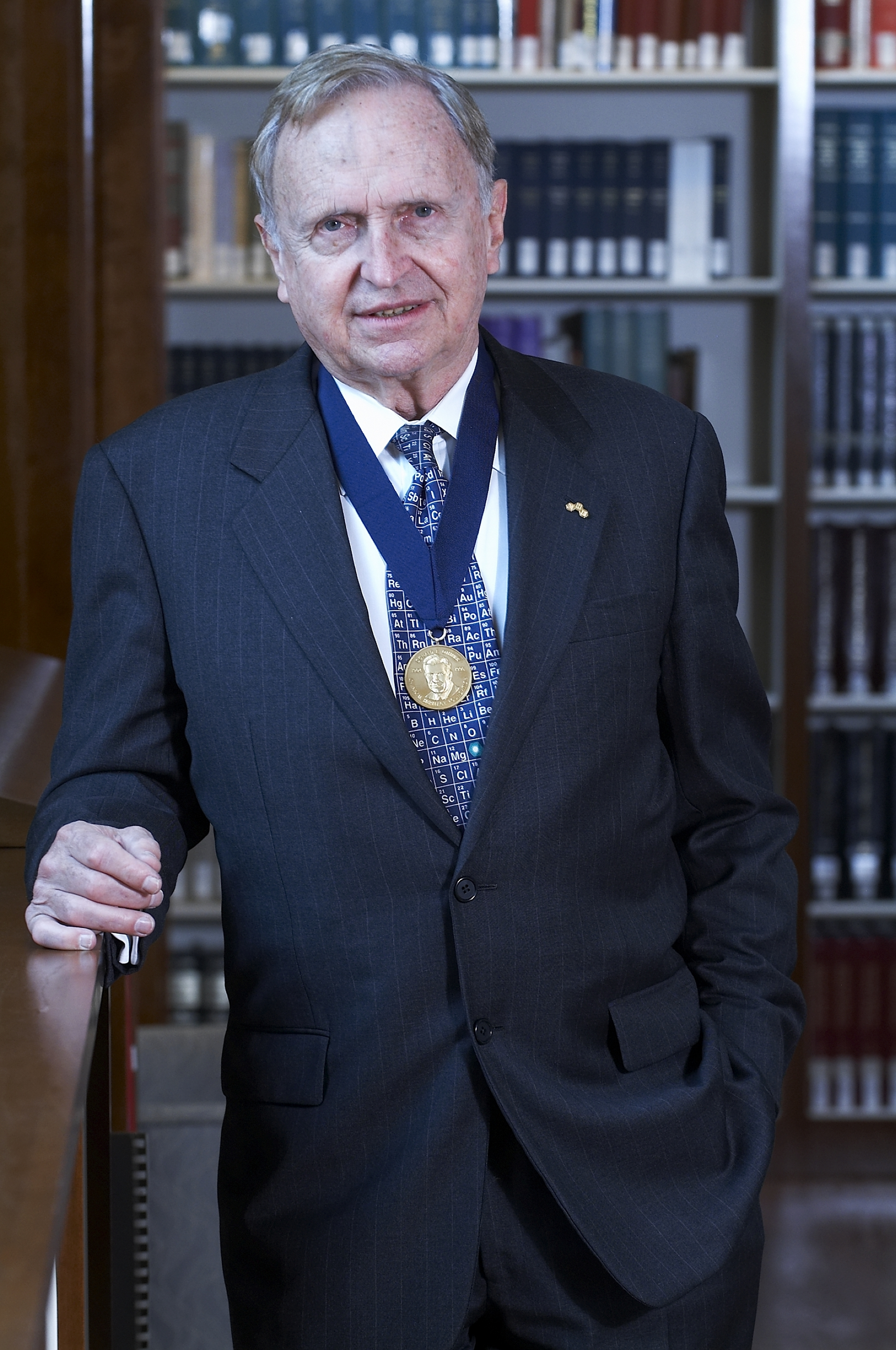
- Born: March 14, 1931; Rahway, New Jersey, US
- Died: October 25, 2017 (aged 86); New York City, US
- Education: Harvard University (BA, MA, PhD)
- Awards: ACS Award in Pure Chemistry (1966); NAS Award in Chemical Sciences (1989); National Medal of Science (1991); Priestley Medal (1999); Othmer Gold Medal (2006); Perkin Medal (2010); AIC Gold Medal (2014)
- Scientific career
- Fields: Chemistry
- Workplaces: Columbia University
- Thesis: Studies on magnamycin (1956)
- Doctoral advisor: Robert Burns Woodward
- Doctoral students: Robert Grubbs; Doug La Follette; Alanna Schepartz; Merle Battiste; Steven Zimmerman; Uday Maitra
- Other notable students: Anthony Czarnik; Robert Lefkowitz; Marcey Waters

Ronald Charles David Breslow (March 14, 1931 – October 25, 2017) was an American chemist from Rahway, New Jersey. He was University Professor at Columbia University, where he was based in the Department of Chemistry and affiliated with the Departments of Biological Sciences and Pharmacology; he had also been on the faculty of its Department of Chemical Engineering. He had taught at Columbia since 1956 and was a former chair of the university's chemistry department.

== Life and career ==
Breslow discussing his life and career.

Breslow was born in Rahway, New Jersey, the son of Gladys (Fellows) and Alexander E. Breslow. He was interested in the design and synthesis of new molecules with interesting properties, and the study of these properties. Examples include the cyclopropenyl cation, the simplest aromatic system and the first aromatic compound prepared with other than six electrons in a ring. His seminal contributions include the correct site of reactivity of thiamin diphosphate in enzymes that promote the decarboxylation of pyruvate – based on his pioneering use of proton NMR with small molecule analogues – and the rate enhancement provided by binding to cyclodextrins produced major themes for study in modern organic and biological chemistry. He also co-discovered the histone deacetylase inhibitor SAHA (Vorinostat) which is FDA-approved for the treatment of cutaneous T-cell lymphoma.

Breslow earned his B.A., M.A. and Ph.D. from Harvard University, where his doctoral advisor was R. B. Woodward. Among Breslow's former Ph.D. students is Robert Grubbs, who won the Nobel Prize in Chemistry in 2005, and Doug La Follette, Secretary of State of Wisconsin. Robert Lefkowitz, who won the Nobel Prize in Chemistry in 2012, studied under Breslow as an undergraduate.

Breslow received many honors and awards, including the National Medal of Science in 1991, the Welch Award, the Arthur C. Cope Award (1987), the NAS Award in Chemical Sciences, the American Chemical Society's ACS Award in Pure Chemistry (1966), the Othmer Gold Medal (2006), the Priestley Medal (1999), and the 2014 American Institute of Chemists (AIC) Gold Medal. In recognition of his classroom skills, Columbia awarded him both its Mark Van Doren Award and its Great Teacher Award. He served as president of the ACS in 1996 and chaired the chemistry division of the National Academy of Sciences from 1974 to 1977. In 1997 he was named one of the top 75 contributors to the chemical enterprise of the past 75 years by Chemical & Engineering News. He was the Myron L. Bender distinguished lecturer at Northwestern University in 1999. The Ronald Breslow Award for Achievement in Biomimetic Chemistry, awarded annually by the ACS, is named in his honor.

He was a member of the National Academy of Sciences, the American Academy of Arts and Sciences, the European Academy of Sciences, and the American Philosophical Society. He is also a foreign member of the Royal Society and an honorary member of many other scientific bodies around the world.

In 2012, his paper "Evidence for the Likely Origin of Homochirality in Amino Acids, Sugars, and Nucleosides on Prebiotic Earth" was retracted from the Journal of the American Chemical Society due to copyright concerns, leading to a debate on self-plagiarism and the distinction between a personal review and a paper.

== Synthesis of cyclopropenyl cation ==
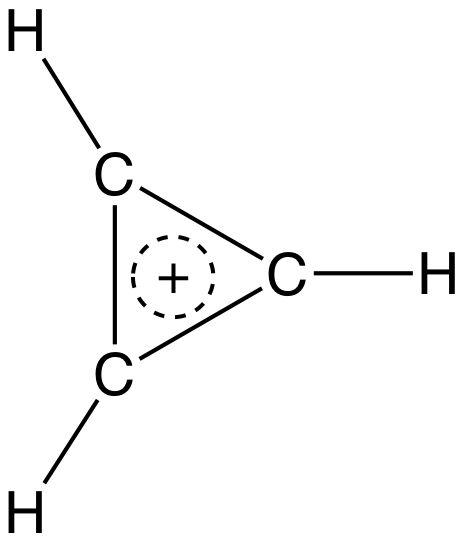
The cyclopropenyl cation, C_{3}H^{+}_{3}

This cation was first prepared by mixing 3-chlorocyclopropene with antimony pentachloride, aluminum trichloride, or silver tetrafluoroborate. Carbon-13 NMR shows singlets with a J_{C–H} coupling constant of 265 ± 1 Hz. The authors suggest that this coupling constant is suggestive that the C–H bond is 53% s character. The overall bonding framework then consists of sp orbitals to all hydrogens, two sp^{3} orbitals for each sigma bond, and one p orbital for the π framework.

== D-orbital conjugation ==
It had been suggested that carbanion-sulfone double bonds will not show aromatic character-primarily as a result of the nodes present in d-orbitals. Straight chain analogs were chosen based on the comparable acidity, combined with previous studies indicating that steric effects are largely negligible. The straight chain analogs are shown below.

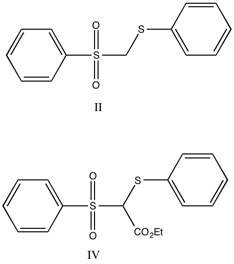
Straight chain analogs for aromaticity studies

Compound II was treated with dimethoxyethane / D_{2}O / triethylamine and was found to be completely deuterated upon recovery. The deuterated compound was then treated with butyllithium in ether, with dimethoxyethane and 2N HCl regenerating the starting material. The cyclic analog (III, shown below) was deuterated in the same manner, and addition of deuterated I, followed by quenching to regenerate the protonated form, was analyzed by NMR. There was one proton peak, and it was shown to equilibrate equally between compounds II and III, indicating that compounds had similar acidity. From this result, the researchers concluded that compound III was not aromatic, because stabilizing effect of aromaticity on the anion should increase the acidity of the parent compound.

Cyclic compounds for aromaticity studies

The ester analogs were prepared (IV and V) and were found to be acidic enough for titration. The compounds were titrated under nitrogen with 0.2N NaOH with a Beckman Model GS meter with an E-2 electrode. Compound IV was found to have a pKa of 8.9 ± 0.1, while compound V had a pKa of 11.1 ± 0.2.

== Origins of homochirality on prebiotic Earth ==
The essential building blocks of life (amino acids and key sugars-ribose and deoxyribose) can exist in one of two forms-L or D. However life has evolved such that the vast majority of amino acids are L and the sugars are D. If the amino acids and sugars present in life were racemic (consisting of both L and D), then proteins, DNA, and RNA would not adopt a well defined conformation, resulting in a loss of function. The question of how this preference first occurred has puzzled scientists for years while several theories have been proposed; there is still no clear answer. There is growing evidence that the chiral preference came from outer space as scientists discovered α-methyl amino acids inside the Murchison meteorite that have a slight enantiomeric excess (ee) for the L conformation. These α-methyl amino acids are believed to be from outer space as a result of their high abundance of 13C and deuterium. Furthermore, α-methyl amino acids are generally not present in terrestrial chemistry. A common critique is that these amino acids would not be able to tolerate the high temperatures upon entering Earth's atmosphere as the meteorite crashed into the planet. However, the amino acids have been found inside the meteorite, with the meteorite acting as an insulator. Unlike regular amino acids, α-methyl amino acids are not capable of racemizing by enolization on an evolutionary time scale, shown below.

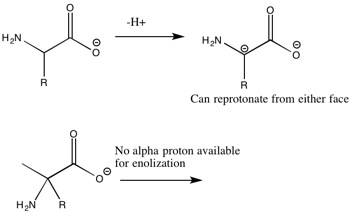
Racemization of amino acids on an evolutionary time scale. Alpha methyl amino acids cannot racemize

However, there is considerable debate as to how the L conformation of α-methyl amino acids was selected for. The most widely accepted theory is that right circularly polarized light in outer space (somewhat) selectively destroyed the D conformation. In theory, synchrotrons produce light of opposite handedness (right and left) above and below the circulation plane. This has been demonstrated in experiments on earth. The theory continues then that neutron stars could act as synchrotrons-with right polarized light pointing in our direction of the universe, and left polarized light pointing in the opposite direction. However, other astronomers claim that the polarization only occurs in the infrared region, which only has sufficient energy to cause molecular vibrations and stretches-far from being capable of destroying molecules. A second problem encountered with the L α-methyl amino acids is how to generate enantiomerically pure regular amino acids from the slight excess. The issue is illustrated in the below figure.

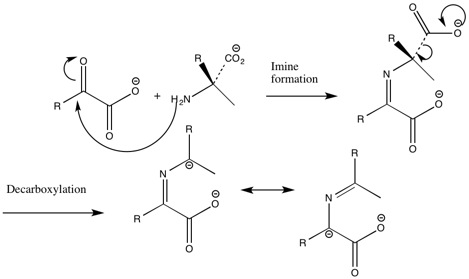
Decarboxylative transamination. Note that the final product shown can be protonated from either face, generating a racemic mixture after hydrolysis of the imine.

Note that the above product can be protonated from either face with equal probability. The final acid is generated by hydrolysis of the imine.

It's worth noting that the alpha keto acid is believed to be formed from a Strecker-like reaction, shown below.

Formation of alpha keto acids. The product shown above is believed to be oxidized to the final alpha keto acid by oxidation by iron oxide, as oxygen was not present on prebiotic Earth.

From figure 5, we see that the L alpha-methyl amino acids do not directly act as a chiral directing group to generate the normal L amino acid. Researchers hoped that a second molecule of the alpha-methy amino acid could act as a directing group, however they found that the D enantiomer was slightly favored when only L alpha-methyl amino acids were present. The figure below shows how the D enantiomer is favored.

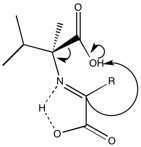
The conformation of the alpha-methyl amino acid favors protonation on the top face of the molecule, leading to the D-enantiomer. Hydrolysis of the decarboxylation product generates the D-amino acid.

When researchers added copper to the reaction, the resulting product was the L enantiomer. Meteors have been found to contain both copper and zinc-justifying the researchers' use of the metal. However, when zinc was used in the same reaction, the L enantiomer was not preferentially formed. Based on computational calculations, the copper forms a square planar complex (shown below) and sterics facilitate protonation to generate the L amino acid.

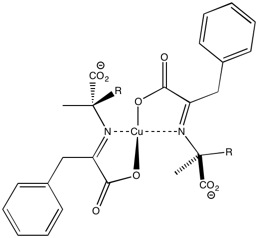
Copper complex leading to the formation of L-amino acids.

When a slight enantiomeric excess is present, the solubility's of the pure and racemic crystal can be manipulated to generate large ee's of the pure enantiomer. If we define certain solubility's as such: KL= [L] represents the solubility of the pure enantiomer KDL= [D][L] represents the solubility product of the racemic mixture such that [D]= KDL/[L] We can then define the ratio of [L]/[D] = [L]2/KDL When both enantiomers are present, a racemic crystal structure is formed-however it is lower in energy, has a higher melting point, and is less soluble than the enantiomerically pure crystal structure. As a result, when a slight excess of one enantiomer is present, the ee can be amplified by evaporating solvent-causing the racemate to precipitate. Researchers have been able to start with an ee of 1% L, and ultimately end up with 95:5 solution of L: D. The results discussed above (particularly the synchrotron argument) led Breslow to propose that the D amino acids and L sugars could generate life in other parts of the universe.
