= Wulff–Dötz reaction =

Chemical reaction

Named after	William Wulff; Karl Heinz Dötz
Reaction type	Ring forming reaction

Identifiers
RSC ontology ID	RXNO:0000681

The Wulff–Dötz reaction (also known as the Dötz reaction or the benzannulation reaction of the Fischer carbene complexes) is the chemical reaction of an aromatic or vinylic alkoxy pentacarbonyl chromium carbene complex with an alkyne and carbon monoxide to give a Cr(CO)_{3}-coordinated substituted phenol. Several reviews have been published. It is named after the German chemist Karl Heinz Dötz (b. 1943) and the American chemist William Wulff (b. 1949) at Michigan State University. The reaction was first discovered by Karl Dötz and was extensively developed by his group and W. Wulff's group. They subsequently share the name of the reaction.

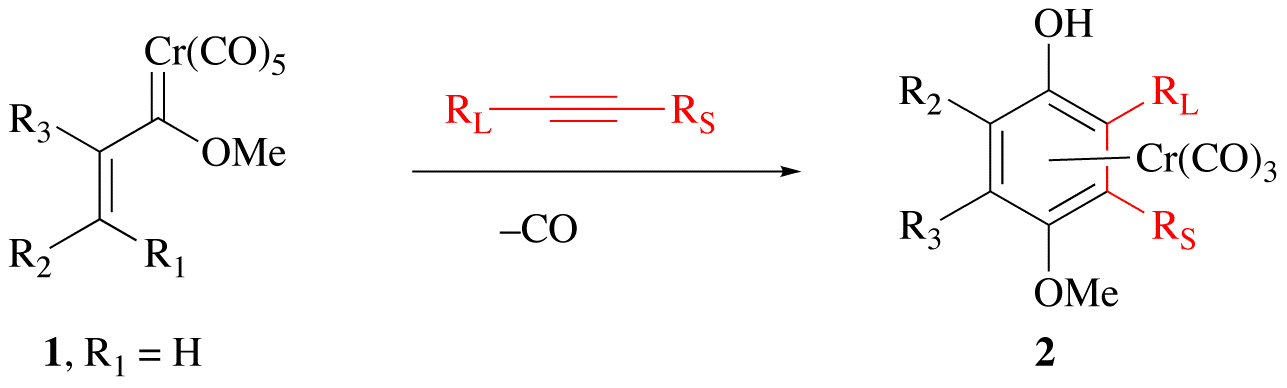
The Dötz reaction

The position of the substituents is highly predictable with the largest alkyne substituent (R_{L}) neighboring the phenol and the smallest alkyne substituent (R_{S}) neighboring the methoxy group. Hence, this reaction is more useful for terminal alkynes than internal alkynes.

The phenol can be liberated from the chromium complex by a mild oxidation, such as ceric ammonium nitrate or air oxidation.

Since this reaction can quickly generate complex phenolic compounds, the Wulff–Dötz reaction has been used most often in the synthesis of natural products, especially Vitamins E and K. It is also applicable to the synthesis of polyphenolic compounds, such as calixarenes.

== Mechanism ==
The mechanism is thought to begin with the loss of carbon monoxide from the Fischer carbene complex 1 to give intermediate 3. The loss of CO is rate limiting making the investigation of this reaction mechanism difficult, since all subsequent steps occur rapidly. The alkyne then coordinates to the metal center, a low-energy barrier process. The resulting alkyne complex rearranges to intermediate 4. The η^{1}, η^{3}-complex shown as 4 subsequently undergoes CO insertion to give the η^{4}-vinylketene complex 5, which undergoes electrocyclization to give intermediate 6. When R_{1} is hydrogen, intermediate 6 is short lived and proceeds to the metal tricarbonyl arene complex 2. Without CO insertion, the reaction proceeds through 7 to the cyclopentadiene product 8.

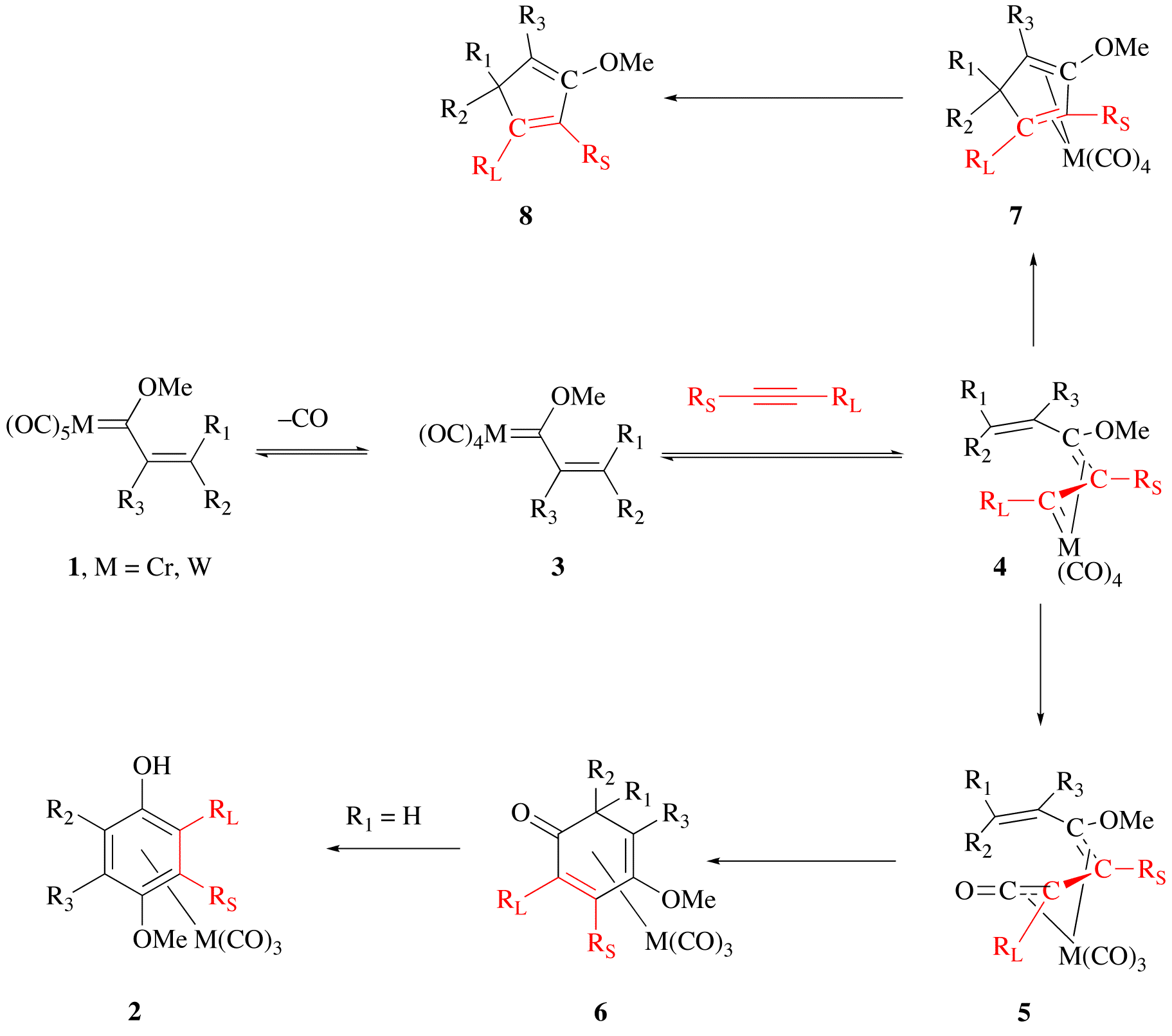
The Dötz reaction

=== Examples ===
Exposing Fischer carbene with alkenyl side chain to an alkyne gives a highly substituted phenol. The phenolic carbon is originated from the CO ligand. The α,β-unsaturated part could also be from an electron rich aryl system, yielding a polycyclic aromatic system. This reaction was first discovered by Karl Dötz and was extensively developed by his group, thus giving the name Dötz reaction. It is sometimes called Wuff-Dötz reaction because William Wuff's group at Michigan State University also extensively contributed to the development of this reaction.

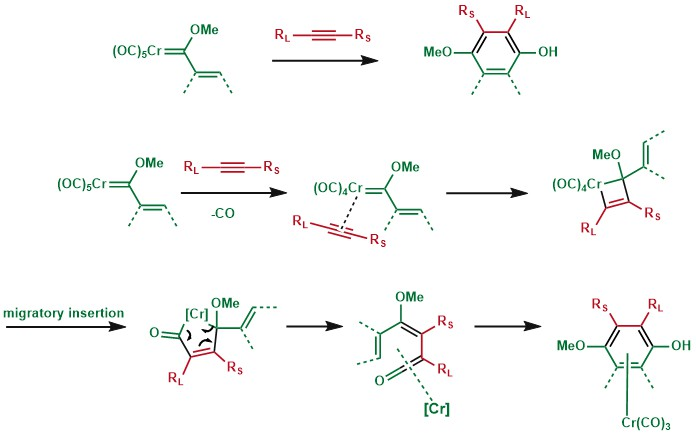

The half-sandwich complex in the Dötz reaction can be demetallated to give corresponding aryl product, or it could be further employed for a nucleophilic addition to aromatic system strategy for synthesis of fully-substituted benzene ring.

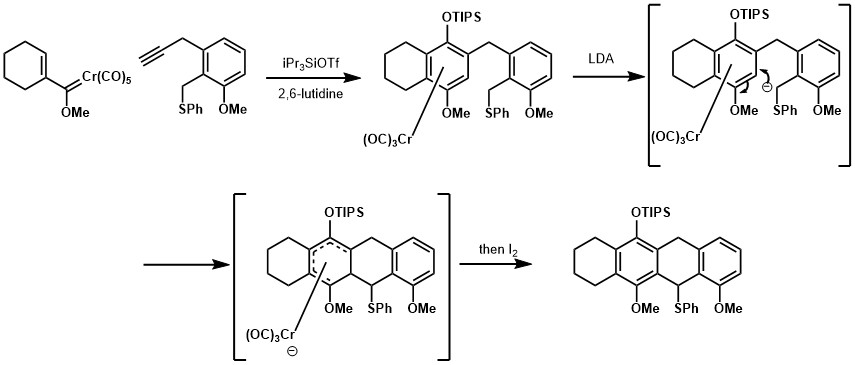

The Dötz reaction has been employed in the syntheses of natural products, as illustrated below.

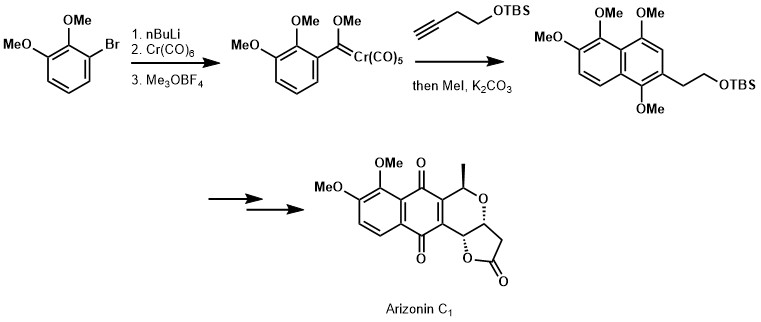

=== Interrupted Dötz reaction ===
In several cases, if the reactivity of the reagent does not meet or the conditions for Dotz mechanism to operate are not fulfilled, products derived from the interrupted Dotz reaction could be dominant. For instance, if the substituents on alkyne are too bulky, cyclobutene product would be observed instead.

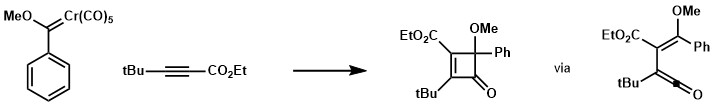

If the alkyne partner bearing a ketone substituent and both R and R’ are not bulky enough, a favored conformation for an 8e pi cyclization could be dominant leading to a fused bicyclic lactone system.

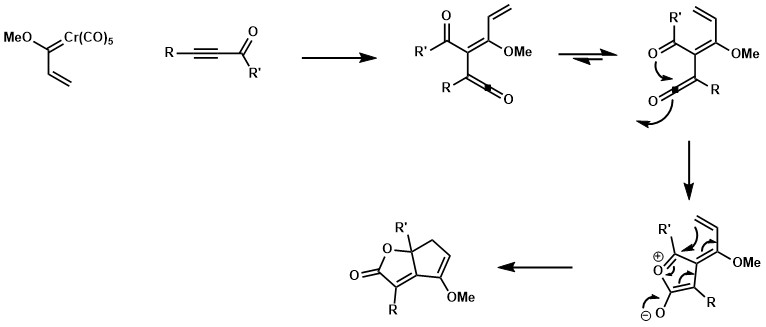

Alkene or nucleophilic moiety on the side chain of alkyne partner could trap the resulting ketene through a [2+2] cycloaddition or nucleophilic addition respectively. This strategy was applied for the syntheses of blastmycinone and antimycinone.

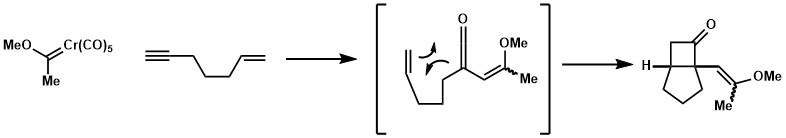
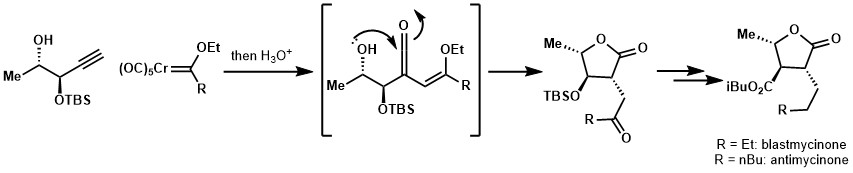

Fischer carbenes with an α-hydrogen could form could give cyclopentenone product similar to Pauson-Khand reaction. This is presumably because of a β-hydride elimination and reinsertion process.

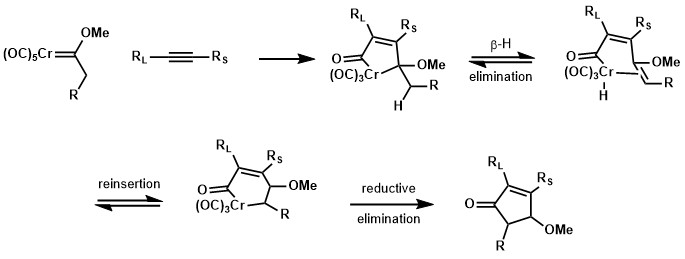

If the alkene moiety is present in Fischer carbene, but not in conjugation, cyclopropanation could be observed. The strategy was employed in a formal synthesis of carabrone.

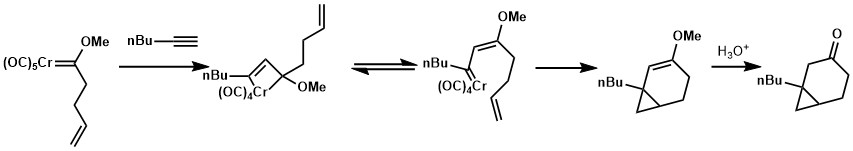
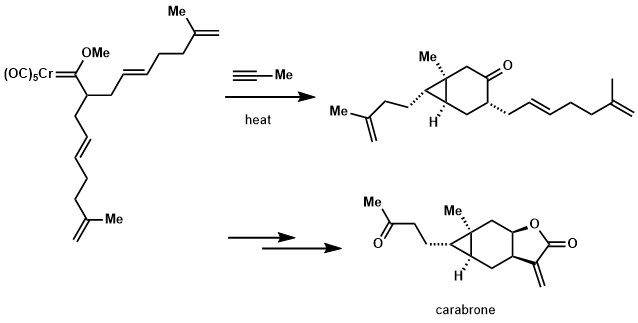
