= Dithiol =

Organosulfur compound with two –SH groups

In organic chemistry, a dithiol is a type of organosulfur compound with two thiol (−SH) functional groups. Their properties are generally similar to those of monothiols in terms of solubility, odor, and volatility. They can be classified according to the relative location of the two thiol groups on the organic backbone.

Structure of some dithiols

Benzene-1,2-dithiol, the parent aromatic dithiol

Propane-1,3-dithiol

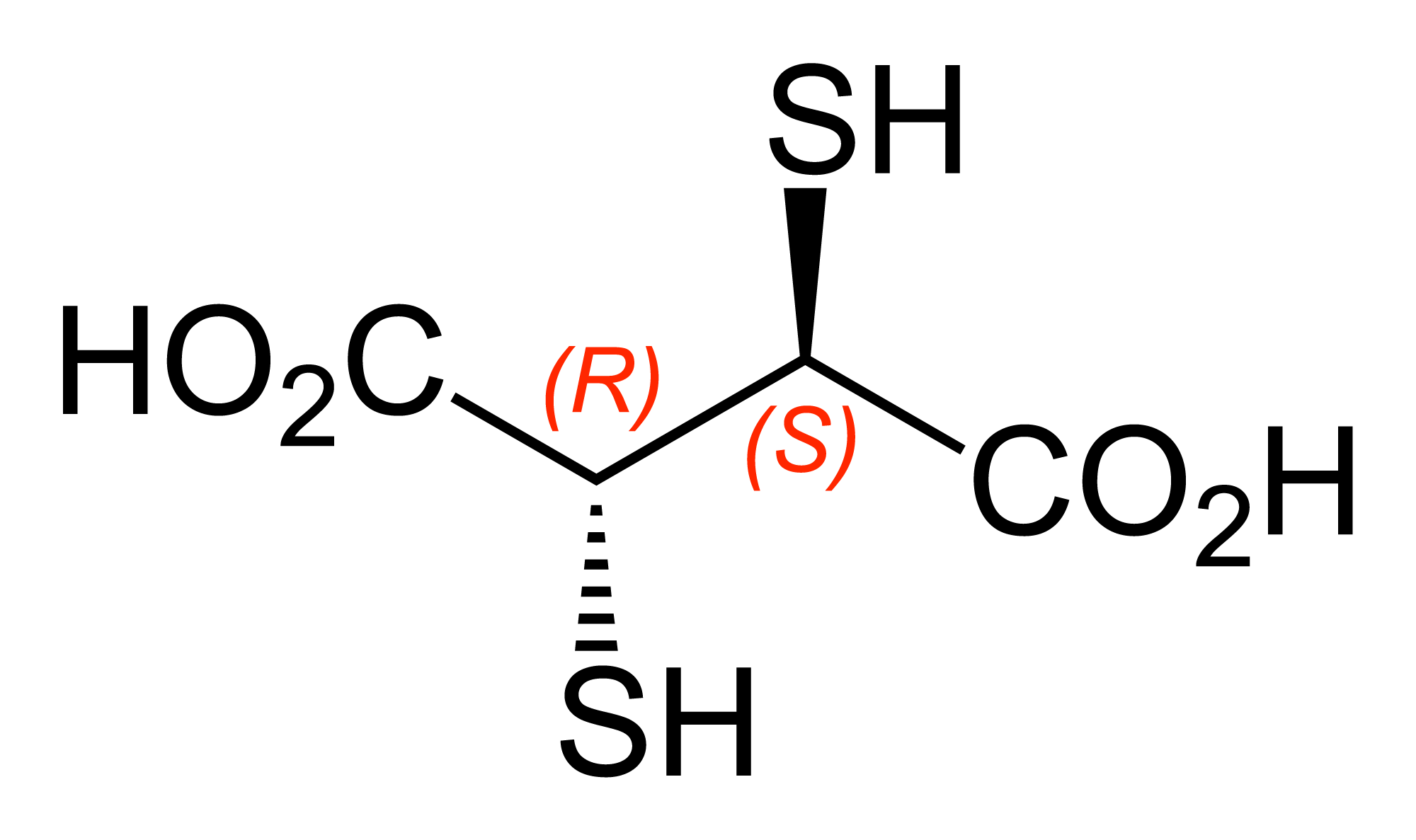
The drug meso-2,3-dimercaptosuccinic acid

Dimercaprol ("British anti-Lewisite"), an early antidote for arsenic poisoning

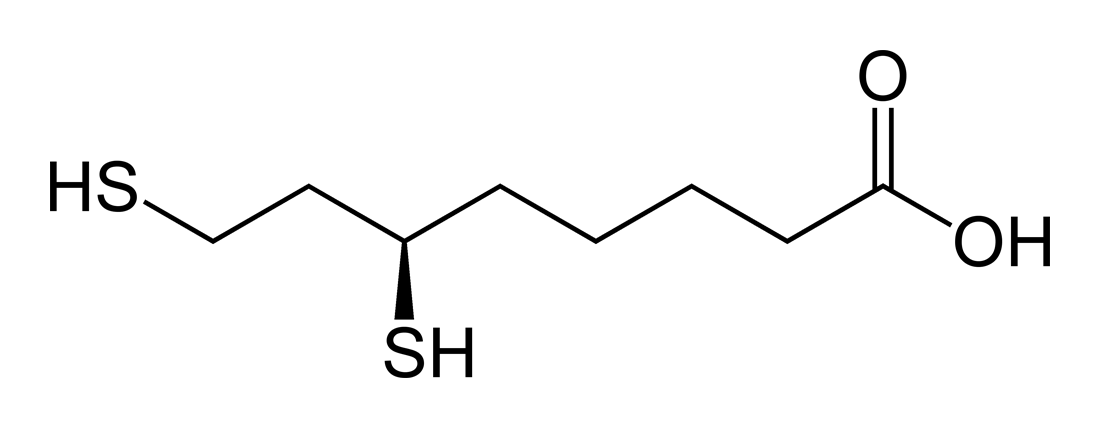
Dihydrolipoic acid, a vitamin

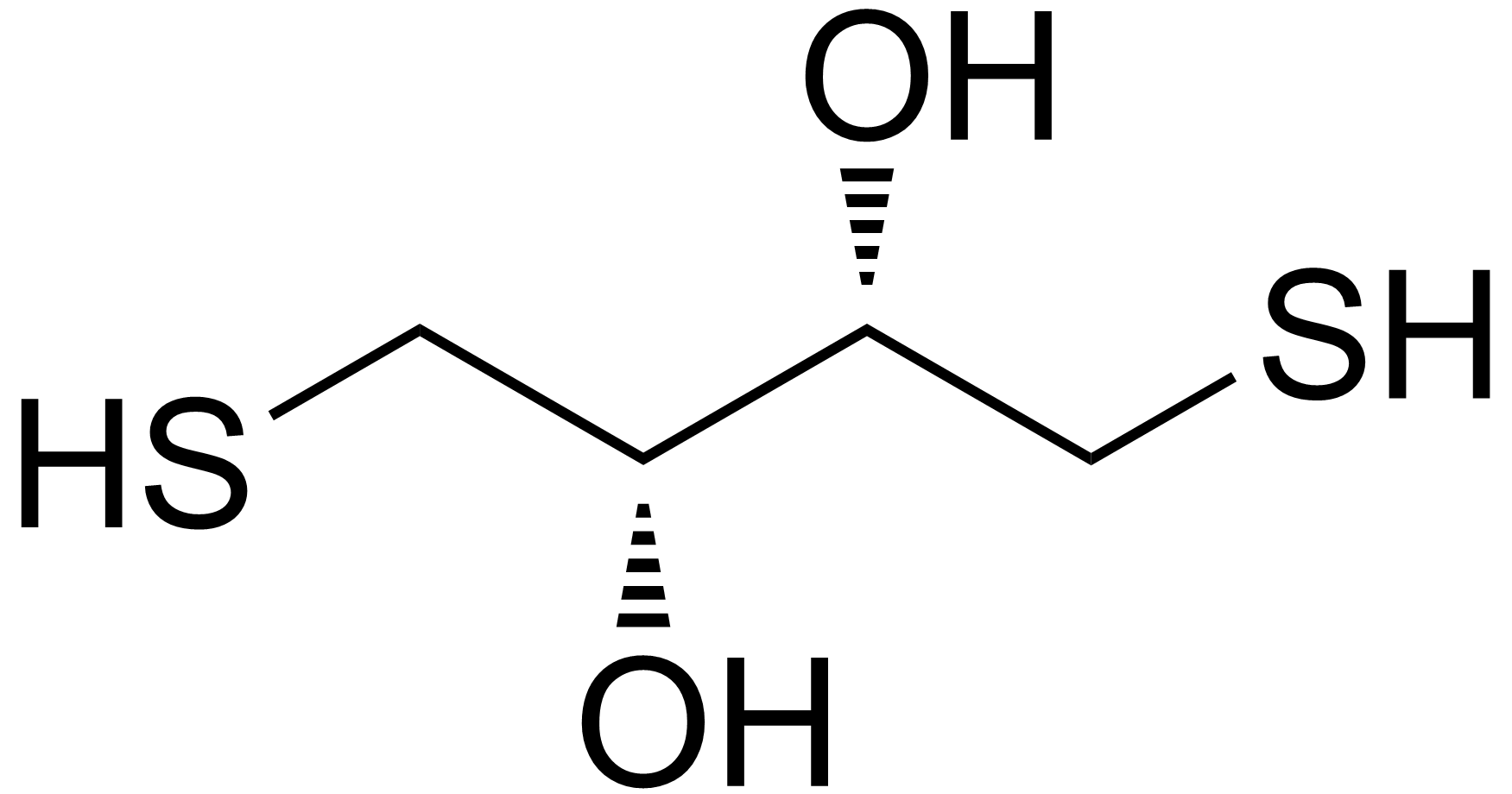
Dithiothreitol, a reagent in protein biochemistry

== Geminal dithiols ==
Geminal dithiols have the formula RR'C(SH)_{2}. They are formally derived from aldehydes and ketones by the action of hydrogen sulfide. Their stability contrasts with the rarity of geminal diols. Examples include methanedithiol, ethane-1,1-dithiol, and cyclohexane-1,1-dithiol. Upon heating, gem-dithiols often release hydrogen sulfide, giving the transient thioketone or thial, which typically convert to oligomers.

== 1,2-Dithiols ==
Compounds containing thiol groups on adjacent carbon centers are common. Ethane-1,2-dithiol reacts with aldehydes (−CH=O) and ketones (>C=O) to give 1,3-dithiolanes:

$$\ce{(HS)2C2H4 + R-CHO -> R-CHS2C2H4 + H2O}$$

Some dithiols are used in chelation therapy, i.e. the removal of heavy metal poisons. Examples include dimercaptopropanesulfate (DMPS), dimercaprol ("BAL"), and meso-2,3-dimercaptosuccinic acid.

=== Enedithiols ===
Enedithiols, with the exception of aromatic examples, are rare. The parent aromatic example is benzenedithiol. The dithiol of 1,3-dithiole-2-thione-4,5-dithiolate^{2-} is also known.

== 1,3-Dithiols ==
Propane-1,3-dithiol is the parent member of this series. It is employed as a reagent in organic chemistry, since it forms 1,3-dithianes upon treatment with ketones and aldehydes. When derived from aldehydes, the methyne (=CH−) group is sufficiently acidic that it can be deprotonated and the resulting anion can be C-alkylated. The process is the foundation of the umpolung phenomenon.

Like 1,2-ethanedithiol, propanedithiol forms complexes with metals, for example with triiron dodecacarbonyl:

Fe_{3}(CO)_{12} + C_{3}H_{6}(SH)_{2} → Fe_{2}(S_{2}C_{3}H_{6})(CO)_{6} + H_{2} + Fe(CO)_{5} + CO

A naturally occurring 1,3-dithiol is dihydrolipoic acid.

1,3-Dithiols oxidize to give 1,2-dithiolanes.

== 1,4-Dithiols ==
A common 1,4-dithiol is dithiothreitol (DTT), HSCH_{2}CH(OH)CH(OH)CH_{2}SH, sometimes called Cleland's reagent, for to reduce protein disulfide bonds. Oxidation of DTT results a stable six-membered heterocyclic ring with an internal disulfide bond.

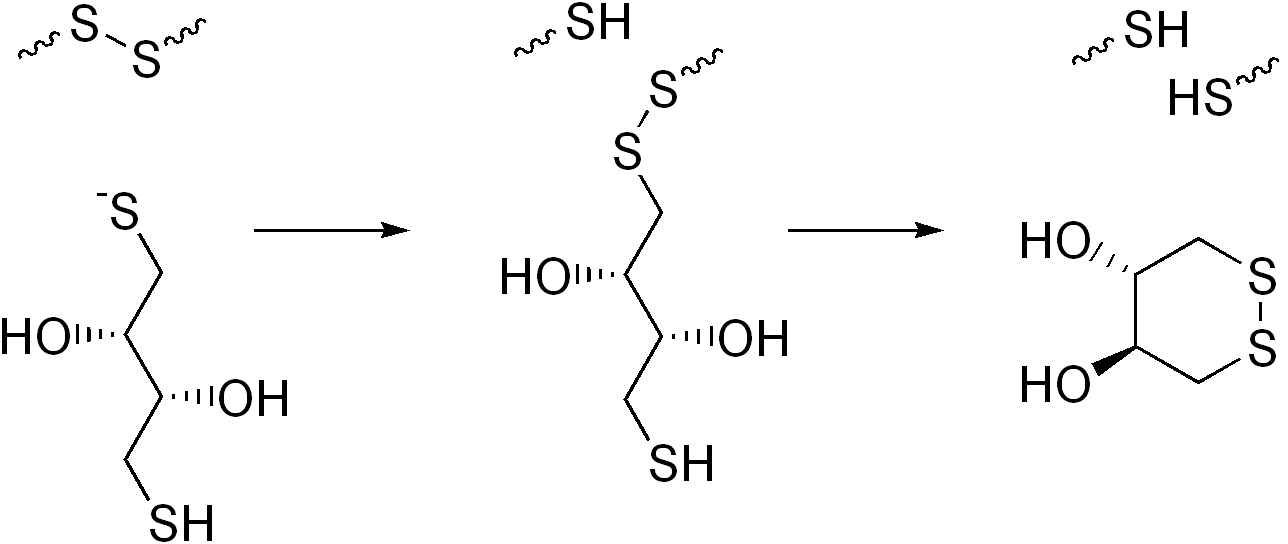
Reduction of a typical disulfide bond by DTT via two sequential thiol-disulfide exchange reactions.
