= C2H6S2 =

The molecular formula C_{2}H_{6}S_{2} (molar mass: 94.20 g/mol, exact mass: 93.99109 u) may refer to:

- Dimethyl disulfide (DMDS)
- 1,1-Ethanedithiol
- 1,2-Ethanedithiol (EDT)
