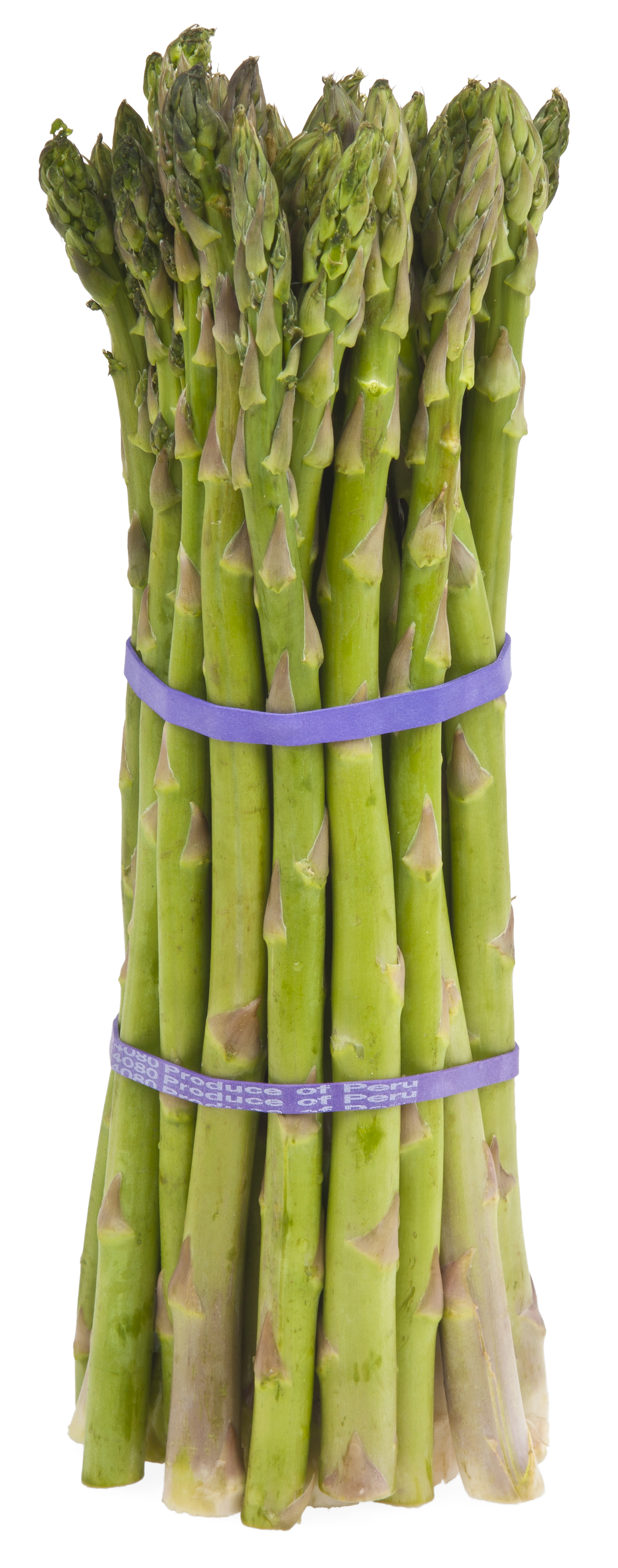
- A bundle of cultivated asparagus

Conservation status
- Least Concern (IUCN 3.1)

Scientific classification
- Kingdom: Plantae
- Clade: Tracheophytes
- Clade: Angiosperms
- Clade: Monocots
- Order: Asparagales
- Family: Asparagaceae
- Subfamily: Asparagoideae
- Genus: Asparagus
- Species: A. officinalis

Binomial name
- Asparagus officinalis L.

Synonyms
- List: Asparagus altilis (L.) Asch.; Asparagus caspius Schult. & Schult.f.; Asparagus esculentus Salisb.; Asparagus fiori Sennen; Asparagus hedecarpus Andrews ex Baker; Asparagus hortensis Mill. ex Baker; Asparagus littoralis Steven; Asparagus oxycarpus Steven; Asparagus paragus Gueldenst. ex Ledeb.; Asparagus polyphyllus Steven ex Ledeb.; Asparagus sativus Mill.; Asparagus setiformis Krylov; Asparagus vulgaris Gueldenst. ex Ledeb.

= Asparagus =

Species of flowering plant

Asparagus (Asparagus officinalis) or garden asparagus is a perennial flowering plant species in the genus Asparagus native to Eurasia. Widely cultivated as a vegetable crop, its young shoots are used as a spring vegetable. In 2024, world production of asparagus was 8.9 million tonnes, led by China with 87% of the total.

== Description ==
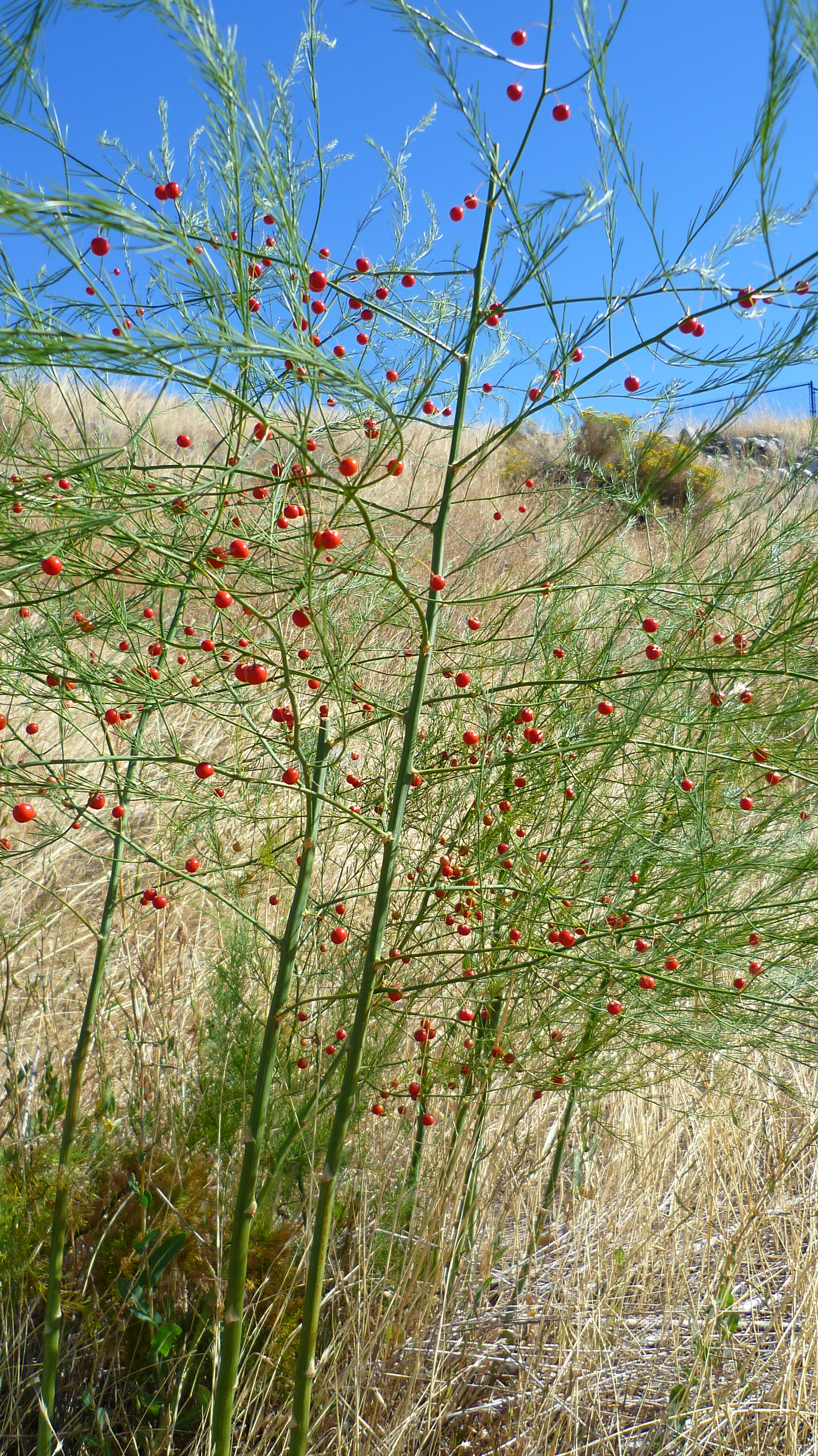
Adult plant with fruits

Asparagus is an herbaceous, perennial plant growing typically to 100–150 centimetres (3–5 feet) tall, with stout stems with much-branched, feathery foliage. It has been known to grow as long as 3.5 metres (11 ft). The 'leaves' are needle-like cladodes (modified stems) in the axils of scale leaves; they are 6–32 millimetres (1/4–1 1/4 inches) long and 1 mm (1/32 in) broad, and clustered in fours, up to 15, together, in a rose-like shape. The root system, often referred to as a 'crown', is adventitious; the root type is fasciculated.

The flowers are bell-shaped, greenish-white to yellowish, 4.5–6.5 mm (3/16–1/4 in) long, with six tepals partially fused together at the base; they are produced singly or in clusters of two or three in the junctions of the branchlets. It is usually dioecious, with male and female flowers on separate plants, but sometimes hermaphrodite flowers are found. The fruit is a small red berry 6–10 mm (1/4–13/32 in) in diameter, which is toxic to humans.

Asparagus grown natively to the western coasts of Europe (from northern Spain to northwest Germany, north Ireland, and Great Britain) are treated as A. officinalis subsp. prostratus (Dumort.) Corb., distinguished by its low-growing, often prostrate stems growing to only 30–70 cm (12–28 in) high, and shorter cladodes 2–18 mm (3/32–23/32 in) long. Some authors treat it as a distinct species, A. prostratus Dumort.

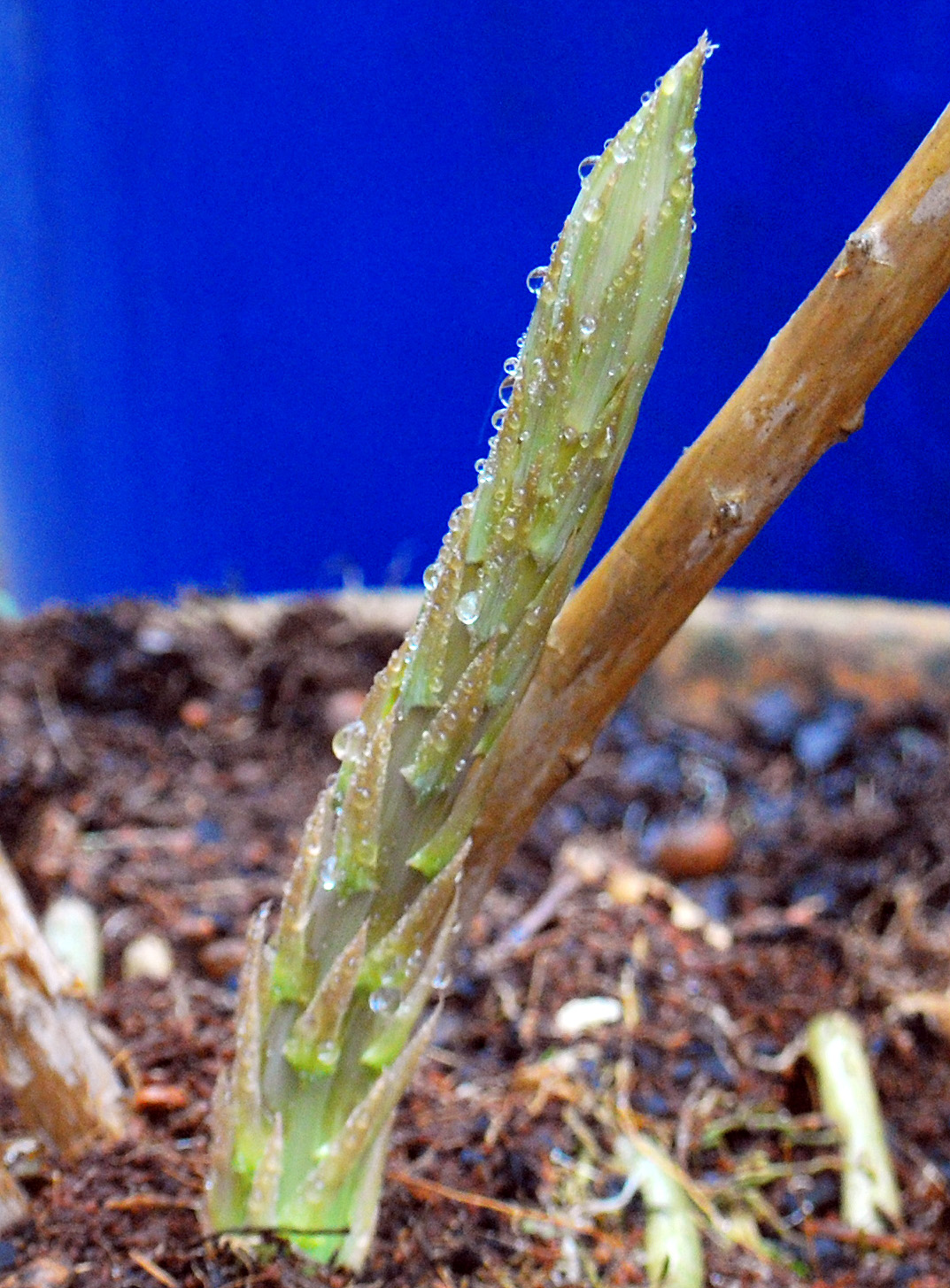
Asparagus shoot before becoming woody

== Etymology ==
The English word asparagus derives from classical Latin but the plant was once known in English as sperage, from the Medieval Latin sparagus. (Note: Around 1000 AD the word "sparagus" appeared in an English text. See Brunning 2010, p. 6 – Brunning uses the term "in print", though no printing technique was used in England at the time. In the same sentence, she states that peasants often called it "sparrow grass", and further on mentions a 1667 diary in which Samuel Pepys bought a bundle of "sparrow grass" in Fenchurch Street, London.) This term itself derives from the Ancient Greek: ἀσπάραγος (aspáragos), a variant of Ancient Greek: ἀσφάραγος (aspháragos). The Greek terms are of uncertain provenance; the former form admits the possibility of a Proto-Indo-European root meaning "to jerk, scatter", directly or via a Persian descendant meaning "twig, branch"; but the Ancient Greek word itself, meaning "gully, chasm", seems to be of Pre-Greek origin instead.

Asparagus was corrupted by folk etymology in some places to "sparrow grass"; indeed, John Walker wrote in 1791 that "Sparrowgrass is so general that asparagus has an air of stiffness and pedantry". The name 'sparrow grass' was still in common use in rural East Anglia, England well into the twentieth century.

== Taxonomy ==
Asparagus was once classified in the lily family, as were the related Allium species onions and garlic. Genetic research currently places lilies, Allium, and asparagus in three separate families: the Liliaceae, Amaryllidaceae, and Asparagaceae, respectively. The latter two are part of the order Asparagales.

Asparagus populations grown natively on the western coasts of Europe are treated as the subspecies group of prostratus (Dumort.) Corb.

== Distribution and habitat ==
Sources differ as to the plant's native range, but generally include most of Europe and western temperate Asia.

== Cultivation ==
Since asparagus often originates in maritime habitats, it thrives in soils that are too saline for normal weeds to grow. Thus, a little salt was traditionally used to suppress weeds in beds intended for asparagus; this has the disadvantage that the soil cannot be used for anything else. Some regions and gardening zones are better-suited for growing asparagus than others, such as the west coast of North America and other more maritime, "Mediterranean" environments. The fertility of the soil is a large factor. "Crowns" are planted in winter, and the first shoots appear in spring; the first pickings or "thinnings" are known as sprue asparagus. Sprue has thin stems.

A breed of "early-season asparagus" that can be harvested two months earlier than usual was announced by a UK grower in early 2011. This variety does not need to lie dormant and blooms at 7 °C (45 °F), rather than the usual 9 °C (48 °F).

Purple asparagus differs from its green and white counterparts in having high sugar and low fibre levels. Purple asparagus was originally developed in Italy, near the city of Albenga and commercialized under the variety name 'Violetto d' Albenga'. Purple asparagus can also turn green while being cooked due to its sensitivity to heat.

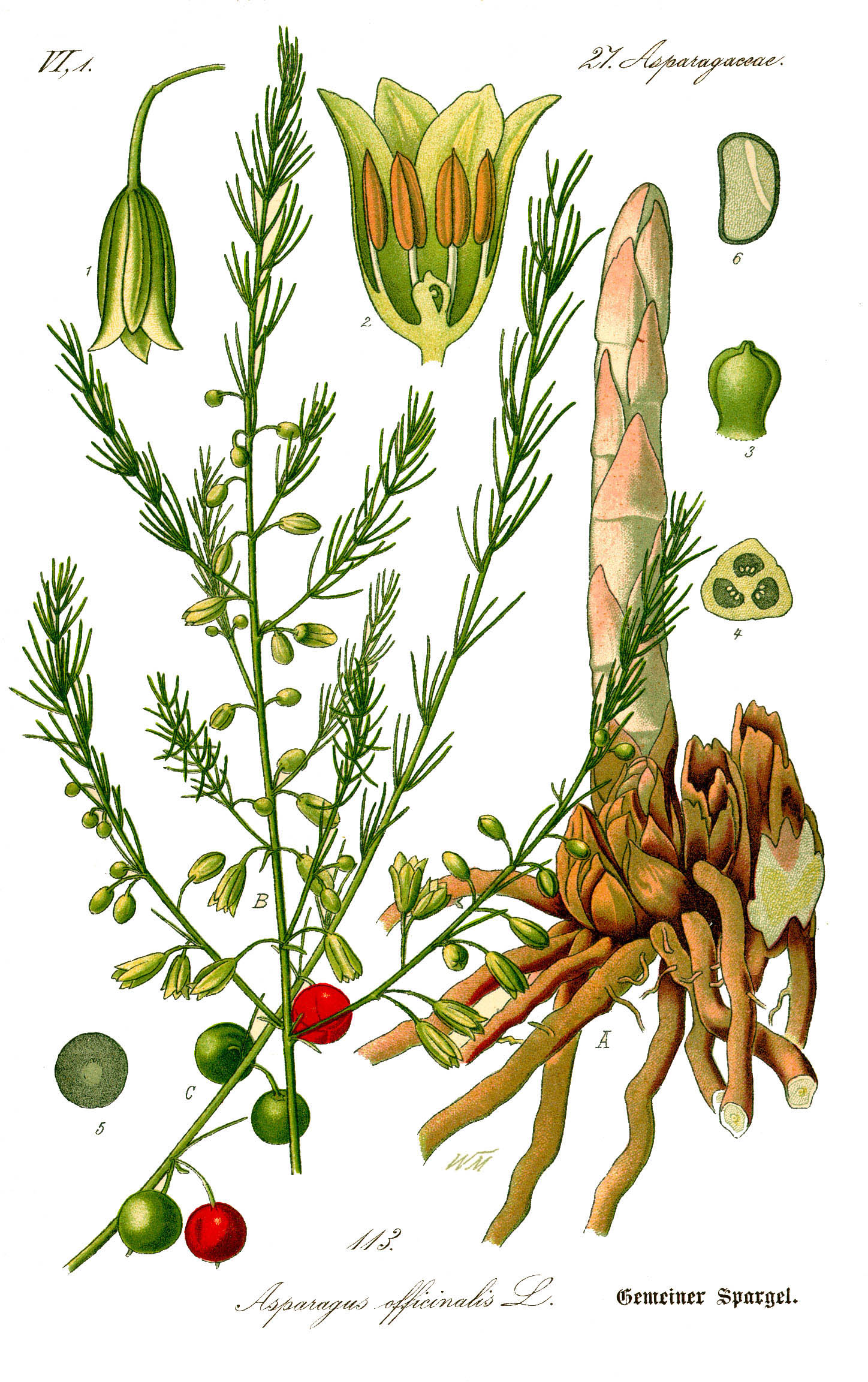
German botanical illustration of asparagus

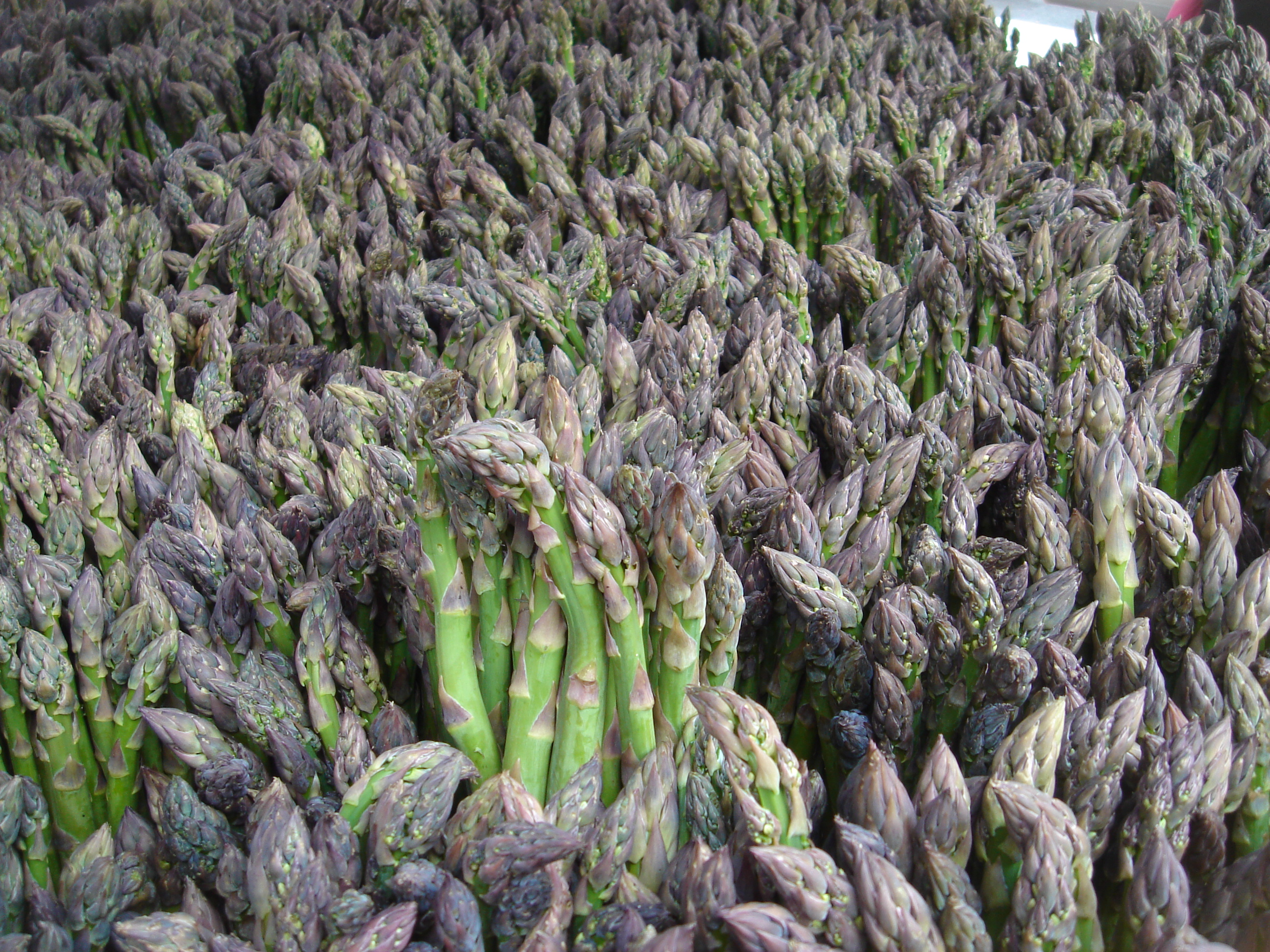
Green asparagus for sale in New York City

Harvest of white asparagus in Hockenheim, Germany

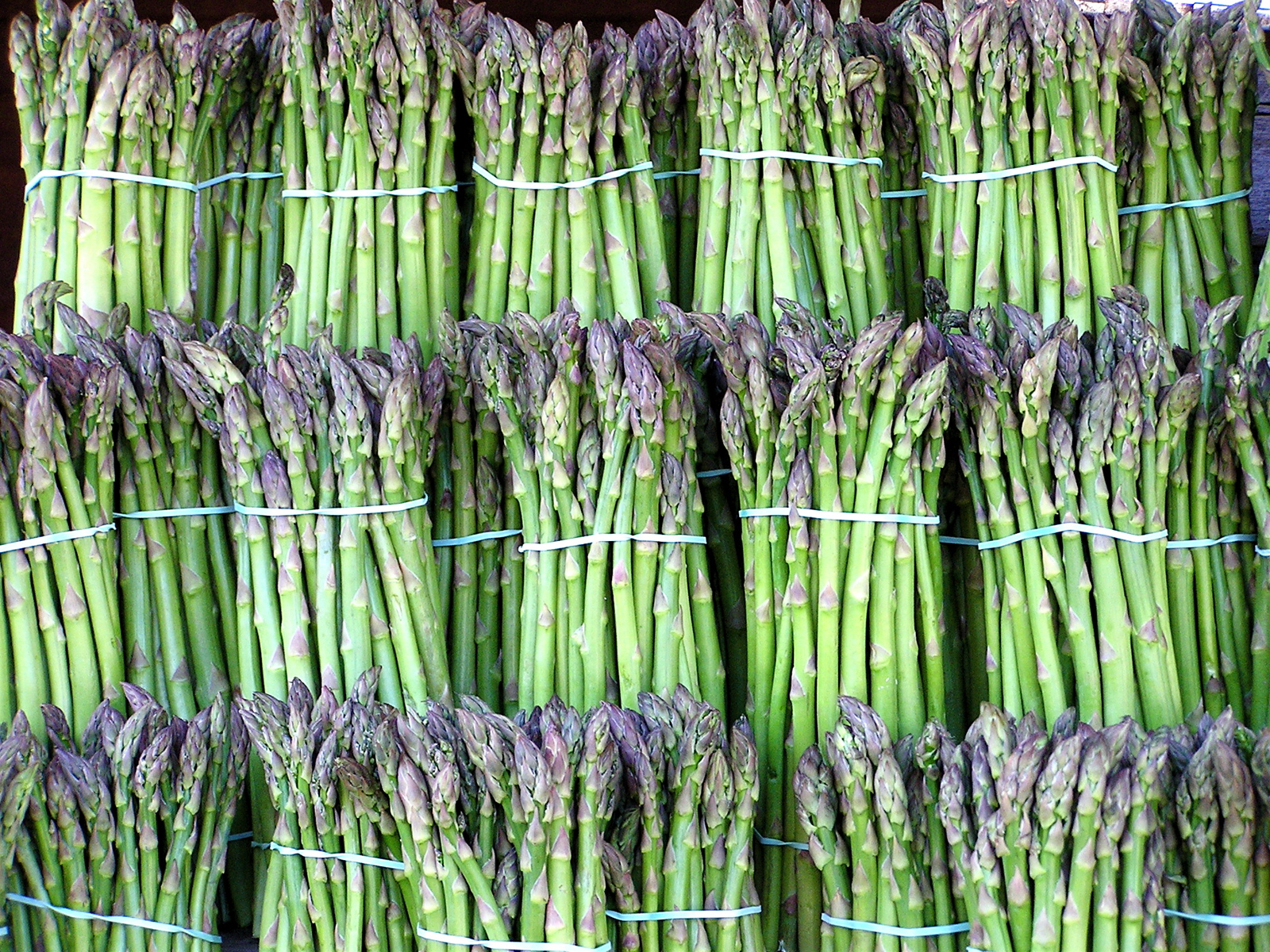
Cultivated asparagus bundles

=== Companion planting ===
Asparagus is said to be a useful companion plant for tomatoes, as the tomato plant repels the asparagus beetle. Asparagus may repel some harmful root nematodes that affect tomato plants.

Asparagus production 2024, tonnes
China	7,784,570
Peru	333,055
Mexico	330,056
Germany	108,130
World	8,909,742
Source: FAOSTAT of the United Nations

== Production ==
In 2024, world production of asparagus was 8.9 million tonnes, with China accounting for 87% of the total (table).

Production of asparagus

Asparagus yield

== Uses ==
The genome of the species has been sequenced as a model to study the evolution of sex chromosomes in plants and dioecy.

=== Nutrition ===
Asparagus
Nutritional value per 100 g (3.5 oz)
- Energy: 20 kcal (84 kJ)
- Carbohydrates: 3.9 g
- Sugars: 1.9
- Dietary fibre: 2.1 g
- Fat: 0.12 g
- Protein: 2.2 g
Vitamins and minerals
Vitamins	Quantity %DV^{†}
Vitamin A equiv. beta-Carotene	4% 38 μg 4% 449 μg
Thiamine (B1)	12% 0.143 mg
Riboflavin (B2)	11% 0.141 mg
Niacin (B3)	7% 1.08 mg
Pantothenic acid (B5)	5% 0.274 mg
Vitamin B6	5% 0.091 mg
Folate (B9)	13% 52 μg
Choline	3% 16 mg
Vitamin C	6% 5.6 mg
Vitamin E	8% 1.13 mg
Vitamin K	35% 41.6 μg
Minerals	Quantity %DV^{†}
Calcium	2% 24 mg
Copper	21% 0.189 mg
Iron	12% 2.14 mg
Magnesium	3% 14 mg
Manganese	7% 0.158 mg
Phosphorus	4% 52 mg
Potassium	7% 202 mg
Sodium	0% 2 mg
Zinc	5% 0.54 mg
- Other constituents: Quantity
- Water: 93 g
- Link to USDA Database entry
- ^{†}Percentages estimated using US recommendations for adults, except for potassium, which is estimated based on expert recommendation from the National Academies.

Raw asparagus is 93% water, 4% carbohydrates, 2% protein, and contains negligible fat (table). In a reference amount of 100 g (3.5 oz), raw asparagus supplies 20 calories, and is a rich source (20% or more of the Daily Value) of copper and vitamin K (35% DV), and a moderate source (11–13% DV) of iron, thiamine, riboflavin, and folate, with no other micronutrients in significant content (table).

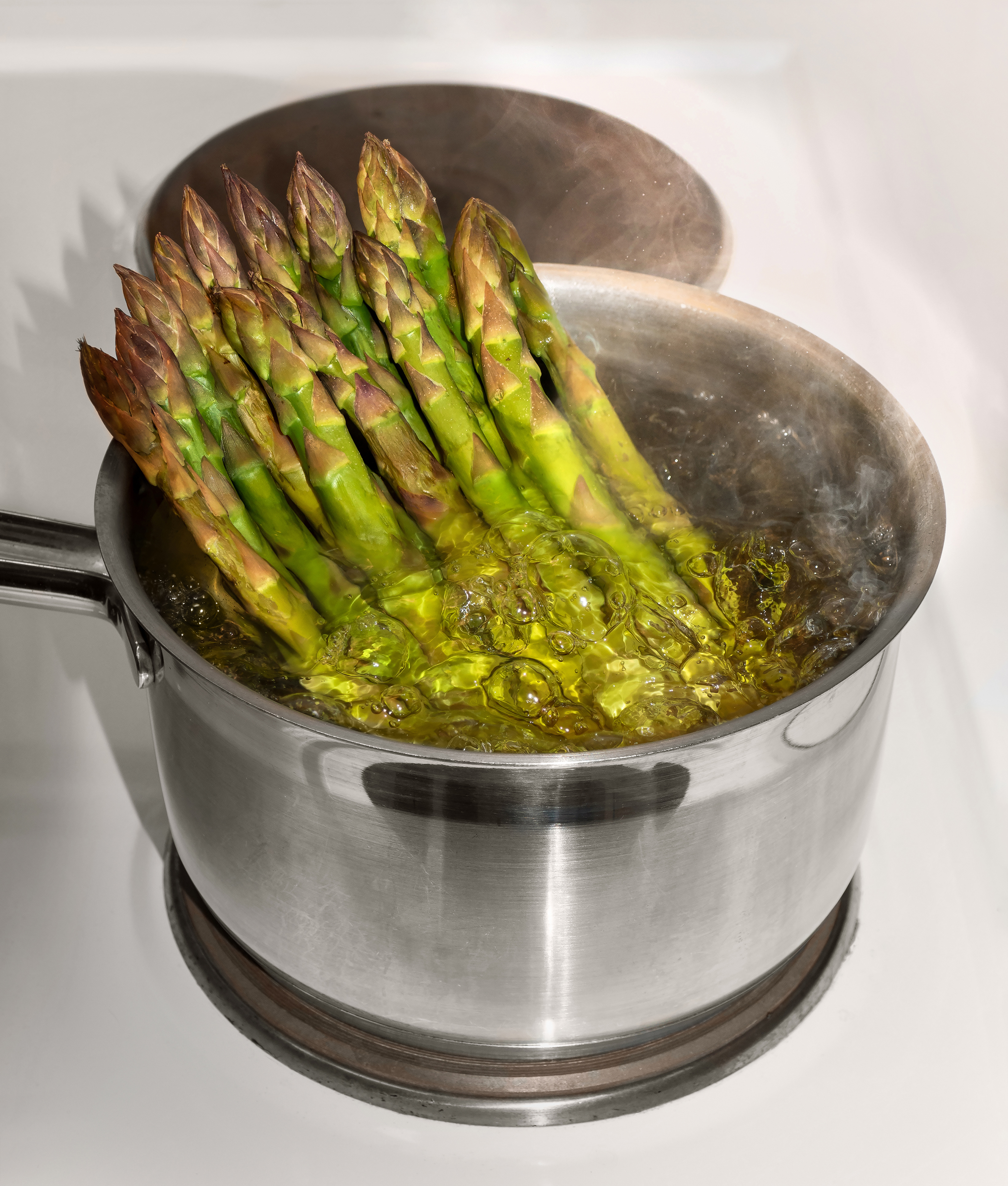
Boiling asparagus in a pot

=== Culinary ===
Only young asparagus shoots ("spears") are commonly eaten: once the buds start to open ("ferning out"), the shoots quickly turn woody. The shape of edible spears can vary according to variety; typical shapes are long thin spears from 8mm to 24mm diameter, no longer than 22cm. The roots contain starch.

The shoots are prepared and served in a number of ways around the world, typically as an appetizer or vegetable side dish. In Asian-style cooking, asparagus is often stir-fried. Cantonese restaurants in the United States often serve asparagus stir-fried with chicken, shrimp, or beef. It may also be quickly grilled over charcoal or hardwood embers, and is also used as an ingredient in some stews and soups.

Asparagus can be pickled and stored for several years. Some brands label shoots prepared in this way as "marinated".

Stem thickness indicates age of the plant (and not age of the stalk), with the thicker stems coming from older plants. Older, thicker stalks can be woody, although peeling the skin at the base removes the tough layer. Peeled asparagus will poach much faster. The bottom portion of asparagus often contains sand and soil, so thorough cleaning is generally advised before cooking.

Male plants tend to produce spears that are smaller and thinner, while female plants tend to produce larger and thicker spears. The thickness of stalks is not an indication of their tenderness; they are thick or thin from the moment they sprout from the ground.

Green asparagus is eaten worldwide, and the availability of imports throughout the year has made it less of a delicacy than it once was. In Europe, according to one source, the "asparagus season is a highlight of the foodie calendar"; in the UK this traditionally begins on 23 April and ends on Midsummer Day. In Europe the short growing season and high demand leads to a relatively high price for local produce, although asparagus is also imported.

Only seasonally on the menu, asparagus dishes are advertised outside many restaurants, usually from late April to June. For the French style, asparagus is often boiled or steamed and served with Hollandaise sauce, white sauce, melted butter or most recently with olive oil and Parmesan cheese. Tall, narrow asparagus cooking pots allow the shoots to be steamed gently, their tips staying out of the water.

In western Himalayan regions, such as Nepal and north-western India, Ornithogalum pyrenaicum, known as "wild asparagus", is harvested as a seasonal vegetable delicacy known as kurilo or jhijhirkani.

==== White asparagus ====
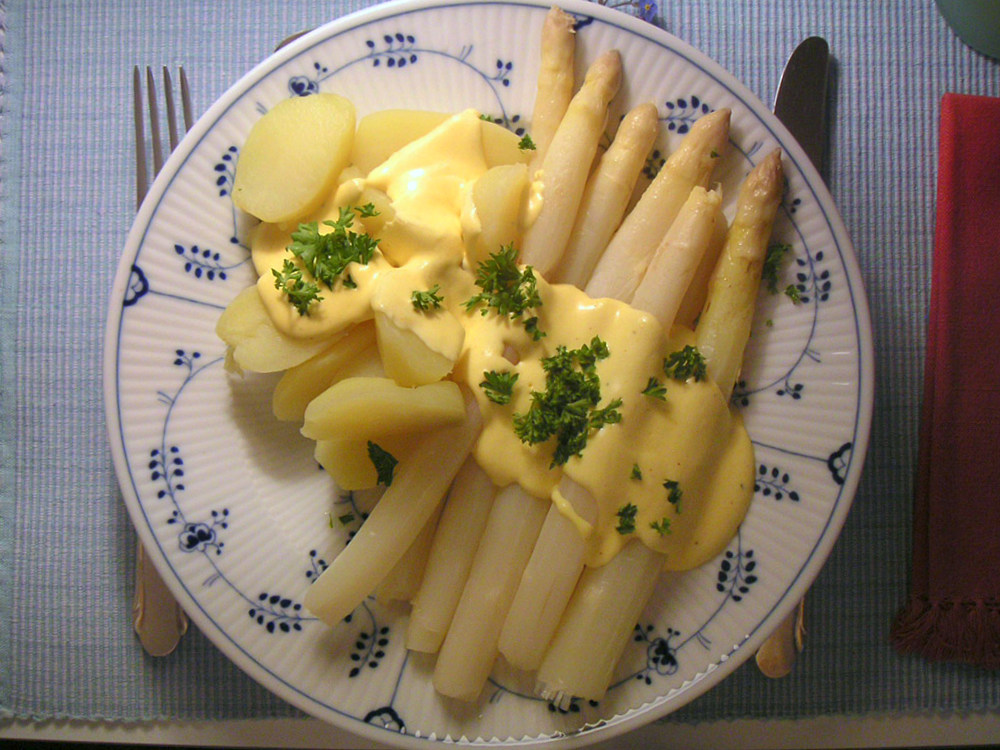
Serving of "white asparagus" with Hollandaise sauce and potatoes

White asparagus is produced by applying a blanching technique while the asparagus shoots are growing: the shoots are covered with soil as they grow, i.e. earthed up; without exposure to sunlight, there is no photosynthesis and the shoots remain white. The locally cultivated so-called "white gold" or "edible ivory" asparagus, also referred to as "the royal vegetable", is believed to be less bitter and more tender than unblanched green. Freshness is valued, and the lower ends of white asparagus must be peeled.

During the German Spargelsaison or Spargelzeit ("asparagus season" or "asparagus time"), the asparagus season that traditionally finishes on 24 June, roadside stands and open-air markets sell about half of the country's white asparagus consumption.

== In culture ==
Asparagus was used as a food in legend by Emperor Augustus who coined the expression "faster than cooking asparagus" for quick action. (Note: Latin velocius quam asparagi conquantur (or celerius quam asparagi cocuntur), ascribed to Augustus by Suetonius (The Lives of the Twelve Caesars, Book 2 (Augustus), para. 87). See List of Latin phrases (V).) A recipe for cooking asparagus is given in one of the oldest surviving collections of recipes (Apicius's 1st century AD De re coquinaria, Book III). In the second century AD, the Greek physician Galen mentioned asparagus as a beneficial herb, but as dominance of the Roman empire waned, so do mentions of asparagus. Afterwards, it continued to be popular in the Byzantine Empire.

Asparagus was brought to North America by European settlers at least as early as 1655. Adriaen van der Donck, a Dutch immigrant to New Netherland, mentions asparagus in his description of Dutch farming practices in the New World. Asparagus was grown by British immigrants as well; in 1685, one of William Penn's advertisements for Pennsylvania included asparagus in a list of crops that grew well in the American climate.

The points d'amour ("love tips") were served as a delicacy to Madame de Pompadour (1721–1764).

External videos
- The French Chef; Asparagus From Tip to Butt, Julia Child, 25 April 1966, 29:16, WGBH Open Vault

=== Odor in urine ===
The effect of eating asparagus on urine excreted afterwards has long been observed:

[Asparagus] cause a powerful and disagreeable smell in the urine, as everybody knows.

— Treatise of All Sorts of Foods, Louis Lémery, 1702

asparagus... affects the urine with a foetid smell (especially if cut when they are white) and therefore have been suspected by some physicians as not friendly to the kidneys; when they are older, and begin to ramify, they lose this quality; but then they are not so agreeable.

— "An Essay Concerning the Nature of Aliments", John Arbuthnot, 1735

Asparagus "...transforms my chamber-pot into a flask of perfume."

— Marcel Proust (1871–1922)

Asparagus contains asparagusic acid; when the vegetable is digested, a group of volatile sulfur-containing compounds is produced.

Certain compounds in asparagus are metabolized to yield ammonia and various sulfur-containing degradation products, including various thiols and thioesters, which following consumption give urine a characteristic smell. Some of the volatile organic compounds responsible for the smell include methanethiol, dimethyl sulfide, dimethyl disulfide, bis(methylthio)methane, dimethyl sulfoxide, and dimethyl sulfone. The odor apparently was first investigated in 1891 by Marceli Nencki, who attributed the smell to methanethiol.

These compounds originate in the asparagus as asparagusic acid and its derivatives, as these are the only sulfur-containing compounds unique to asparagus. As these are more present in young asparagus, this accords with the observation that the smell is more pronounced after eating young asparagus. The biological mechanism for the production of these compounds is less clear.

The onset of the asparagus urine smell is remarkably rapid while the decline is slower. The smell has been reported to be detectable 15 to 30 minutes after ingestion, subsiding with a half-life of approximately four hours.

The association between odorous urine and asparagus consumption was not observed until the late 17th century when sulfur-rich fertilisers became common in agriculture. Small-scale studies noted that the "asparagus urine" odor was not observed by all individuals. Estimates as to the proportion of the population reporting a noticeable asparagus urine odor after eating asparagus has ranged from about 40% to as high as 79%. Those who notice an asparagus urine odor in their own urine (after asparagus consumption) are also, usually, able to detect the odor in urine from people who did not notice this odor in their own urine. Though more recent work has found that a small proportion of individuals do not produce asparagus urine, amongst those who do, some cannot detect the odor due to a single-nucleotide polymorphism within a cluster of olfactory receptors.

=== Celebrations ===
Oceana County, Michigan, the self-proclaimed "asparagus capital of the world", hosts an annual festival. The Vale of Evesham in Worcestershire (another "asparagus capital") celebrates the annual British Asparagus Festival, with auctions of the best crop, an "Asparagus Run" modelled on the Beaujolais Run, and a weekend "Asparafest" music festival.

Many German cities hold an annual Spargelfest (asparagus festival) celebrating the harvest of white asparagus; Schwetzingen claims to be the "Asparagus Capital of the World".

== Gallery ==
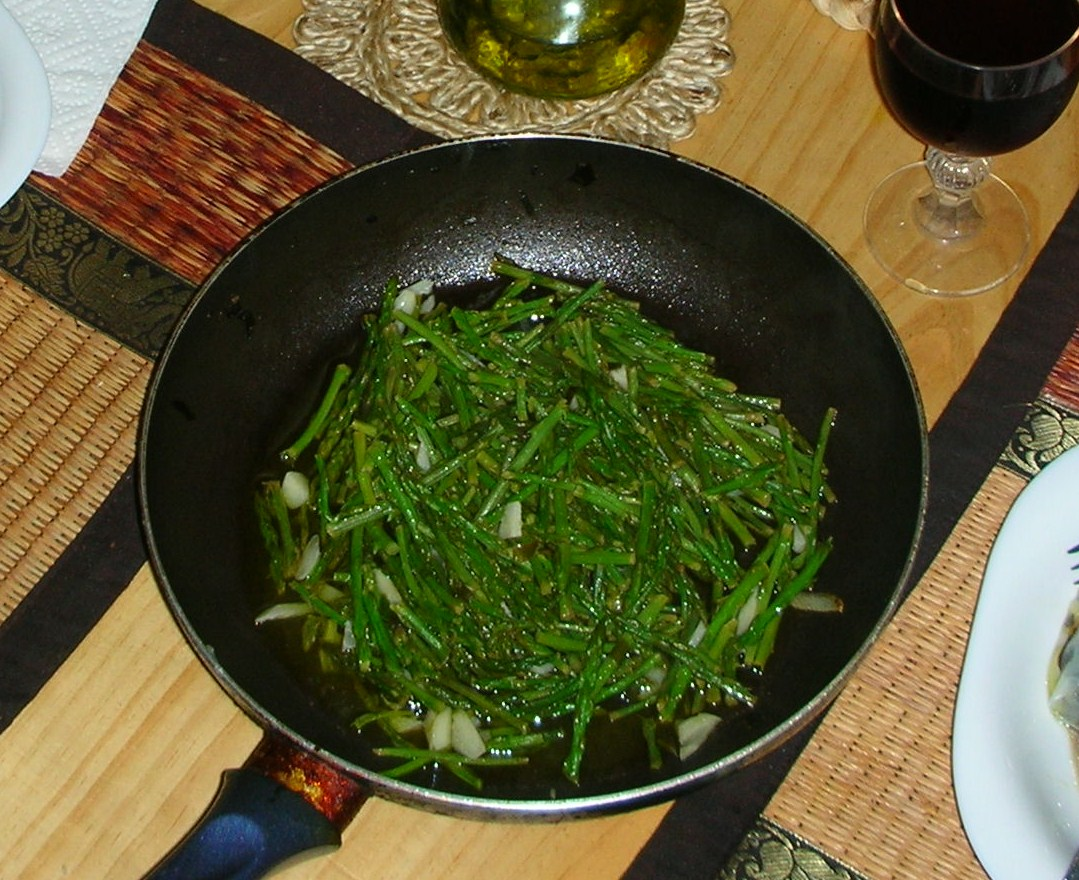
Wild asparagus sauteed with garlic, naam plaa, and soy sauce

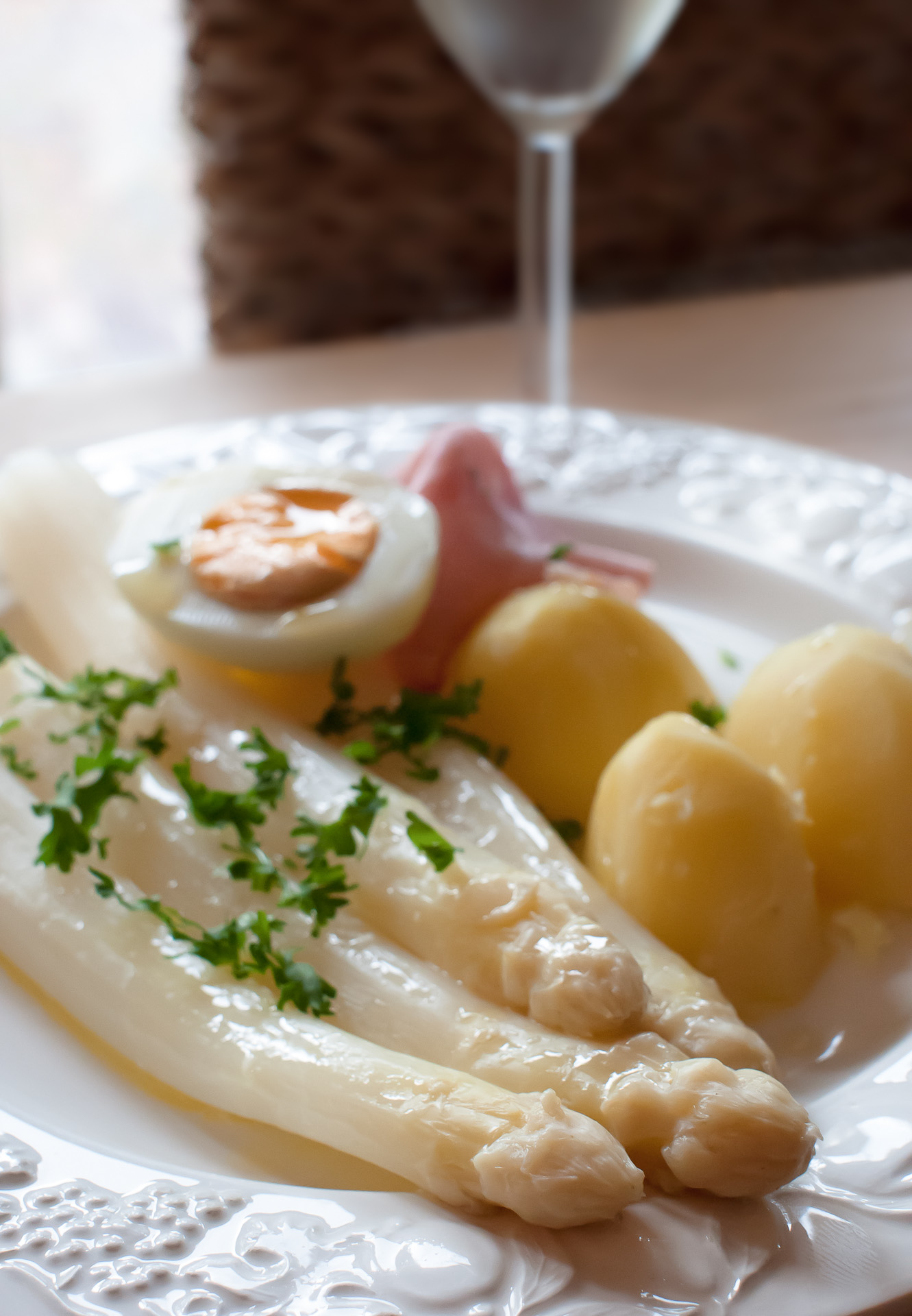
In the Netherlands and northern Germany, asparagus is often eaten with ham, boiled egg, potatoes, and a melted butter sauce.

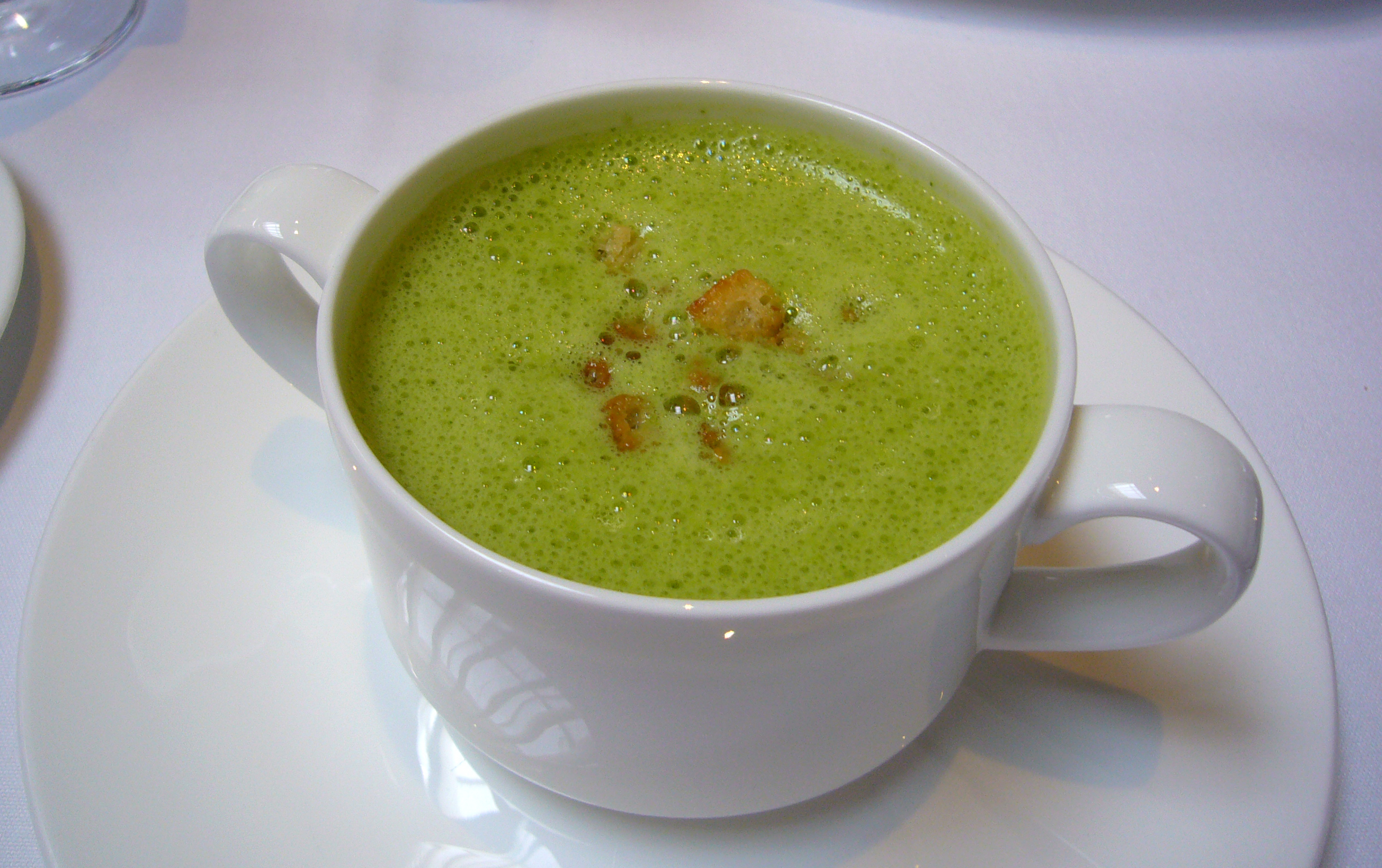
Cream of asparagus soup

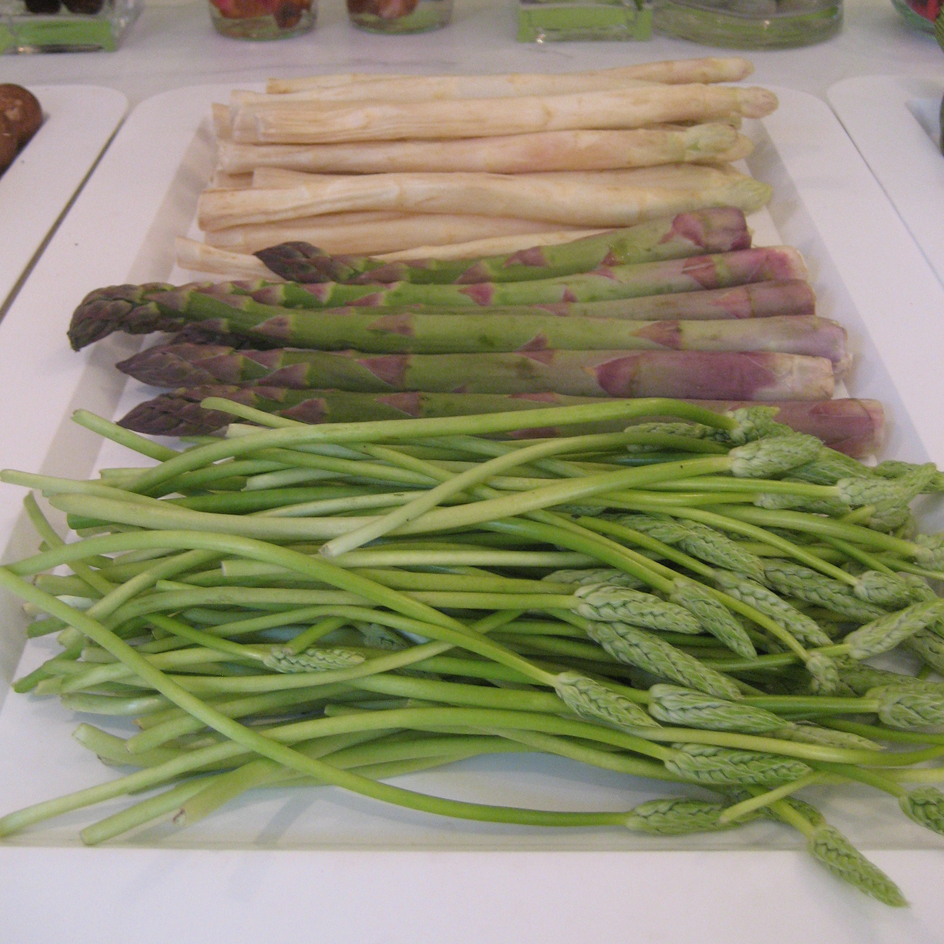
Three types of asparagus are on display, with white asparagus at the back and green asparagus in the middle. The plant at the front is Ornithogalum pyrenaicum, commonly called wild asparagus, and sometimes Bath asparagus or Prussian asparagus.

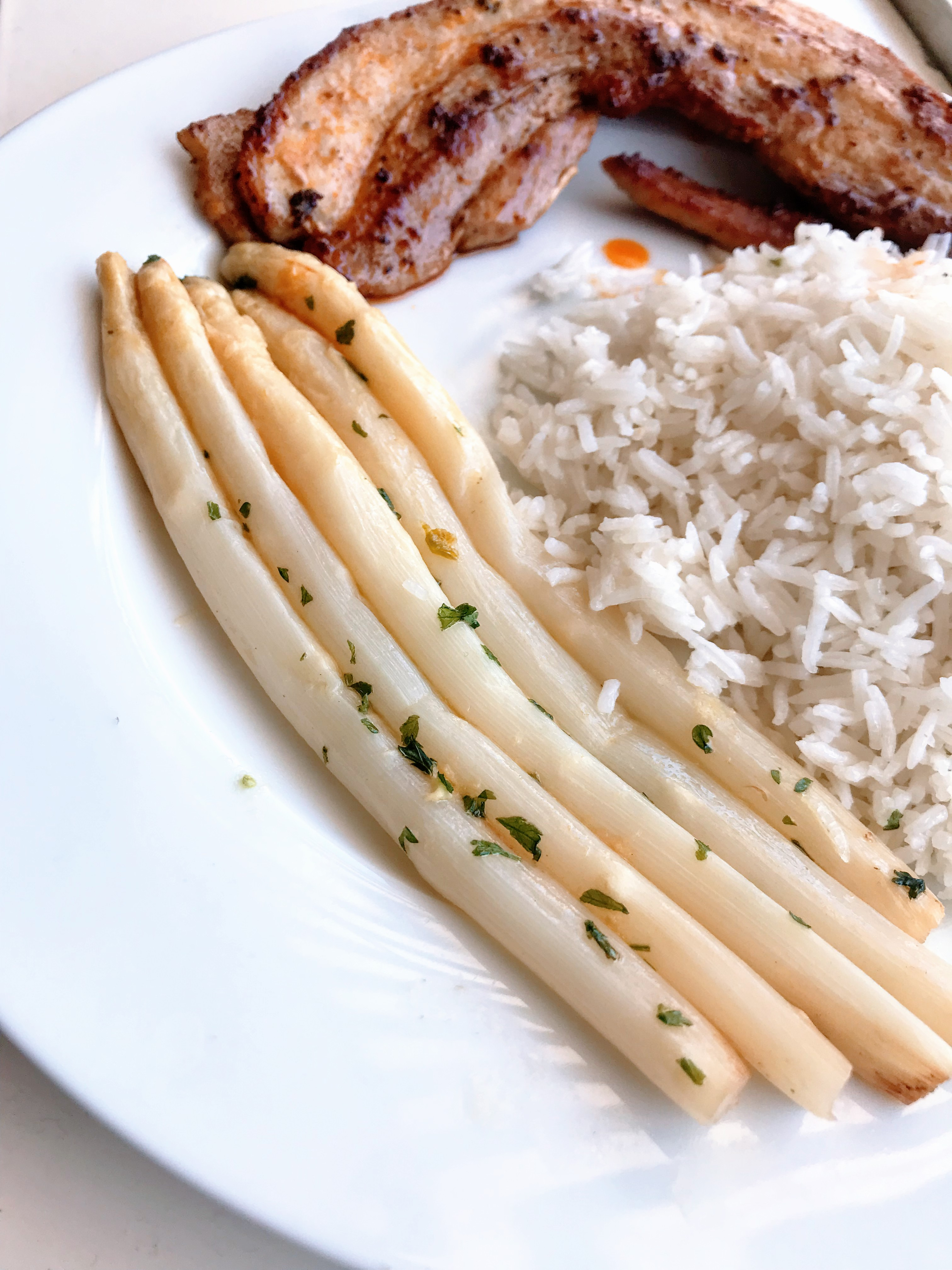
Asparagus served with bacon and rice

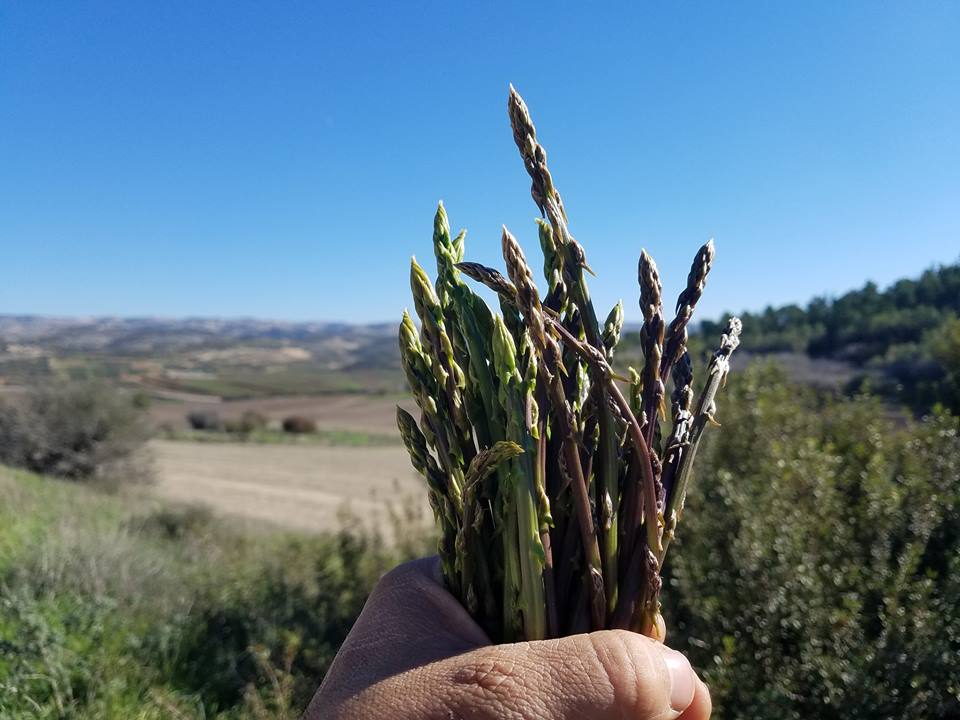
Wild asparagus (Asparagus aphyllus) native to the Levant

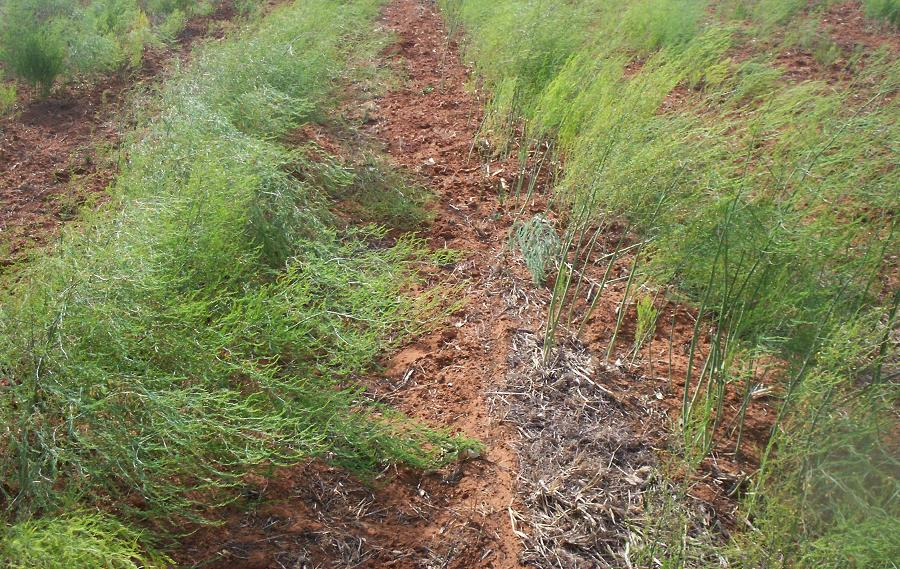
Asparagus in Mildura, Victoria, Australia

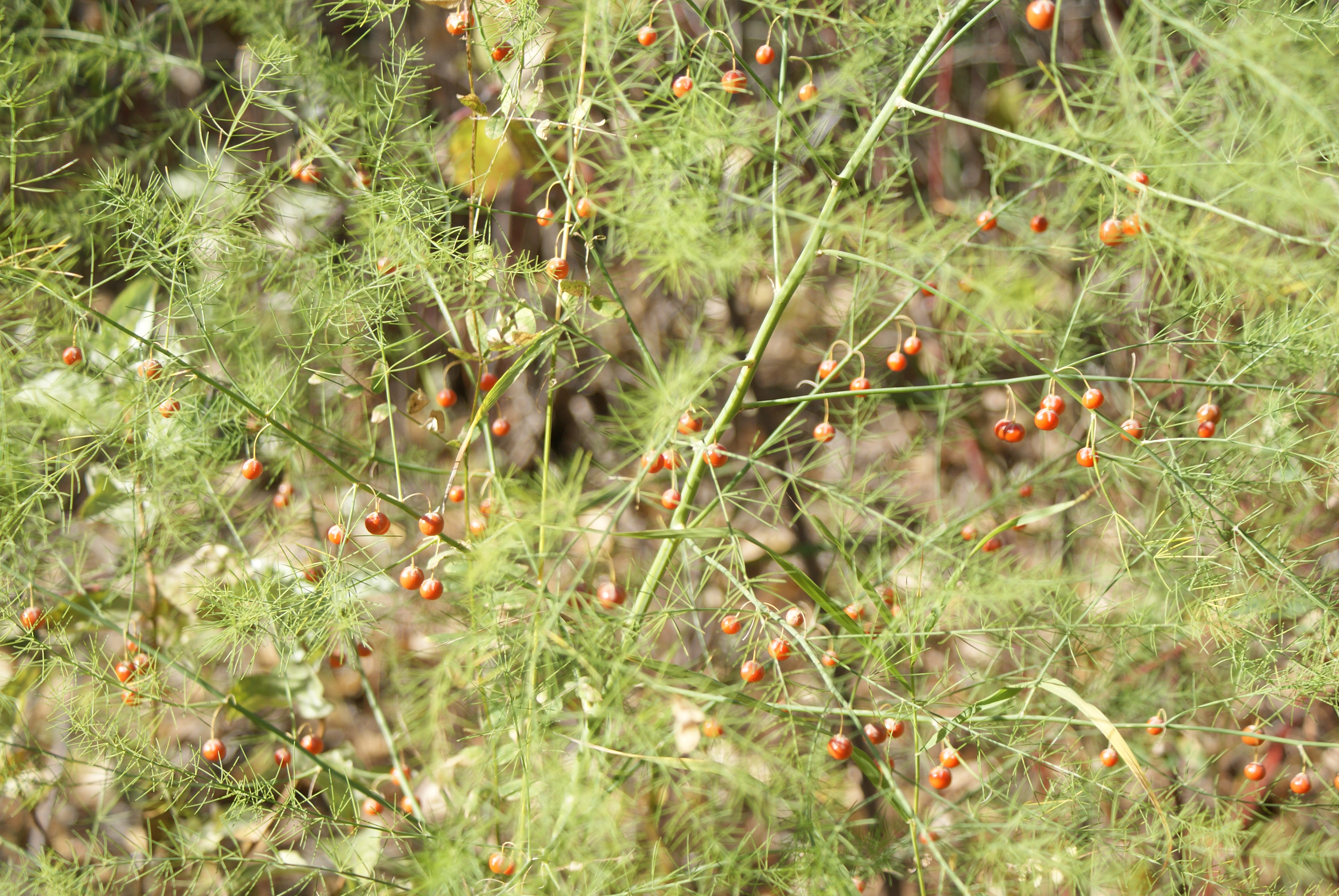
Mature wild asparagus with seed pods in Saskatchewan, Canada
