= 3,4-Toluenedithiol =

Names
- Preferred IUPAC name 4-Methylbenzene-1,2-dithiol
- Other names 1-toluene-3,4-dithiol, dithiol

Identifiers
CAS Number	496-74-2
3D model (JSmol)	Interactive image
ChemSpider	9910
ECHA InfoCard	100.007.118
EC Number	207-828-3
PubChem CID	10334
UNII	U89B11P7SC
CompTox Dashboard (EPA)	DTXSID7060093
- InChI: InChI=1S/C7H8S2/c1-5-2-3-6(8)7(9)4-5/h2-4,8-9H,1H3 Key: NIAAGQAEVGMHPM-UHFFFAOYSA-N
- SMILES: CC1=CC(=C(C=C1)S)S

Properties
Chemical formula	C_{7}H_{8}S_{2}
Molar mass	156.26 g·mol^{−1}
Appearance	colorless solid
Melting point	29 °C (84 °F; 302 K)
Boiling point	185–187 °C (365–369 °F; 458–460 K)

Hazards
- GHS labelling
Pictograms	(GHS05: Corrosive) (GHS07: Exclamation mark)
Signal word	Danger
Hazard statements	H302, H315, H318, H335
Precautionary statements	P261, P264, P264+P265, P270, P271, P280, P301+P317, P302+P352, P304+P340, P305+P354+P338, P317, P319, P321, P330, P332+P317, P362+P364, P403+P233, P405, P501
- Except where otherwise noted, data are given for materials in their standard state (at 25 °C [77 °F], 100 kPa). Infobox references

3,4-Toluenedithiol is an organosulfur compound with the formula CH_{3}C_{6}H_{3}(SH)_{2}. It is encountered as a colorless wax or oil. The compound is classified as an aromatic dithiol. It forms brightly colored derivatives with many metal ions. The compound is closely related to 1,2-benzenedithiol but is often more widely used because it is less expensive. 3,4-Toluenedithiol is prepared by reduction of the bis(sulfonyl chloride) CH_{3}C_{6}H_{3}(SO_{2}Cl)_{2} with tin.

It has been investigated as a probe of thiol-disulfide reactions.

== "Dithiol" ==
Under the name "dithiol", 3,4-toluenedithiol was popularized as a reagent in qualitative inorganic analysis. It was promoted as an alternative to hydrogen sulfide since it also forms colorful solid precipitates with a variety of metal ions.
