= Asparagusate reductase =

asparagusate reductase

Identifiers
- EC no.: 1.8.1.11
- CAS no.: 56126-52-4

Databases
- IntEnz: IntEnz view
- BRENDA: BRENDA entry
- ExPASy: NiceZyme view
- KEGG: KEGG entry
- MetaCyc: metabolic pathway
- PRIAM: profile
- PDB structures: RCSB PDB PDBe PDBsum
- Gene Ontology: AmiGO / QuickGO
Search
- PMC: articles
- PubMed: articles
- NCBI: proteins

Asparagusate reductase (EC 1.8.1.11) is an enzyme that catalyzes the chemical reaction

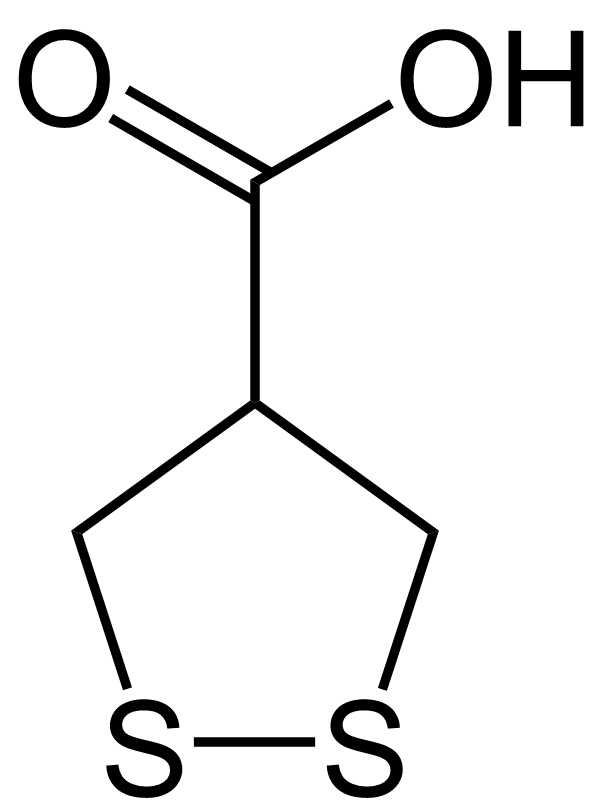
asparagusic acid
+ NADPH
H^{+}
H^{+}
3-mercapto-2-mercaptomethylpropanoic acid
+ NADP^{+}

The three substrates of this enzyme are asparagusic acid, reduced nicotinamide adenine dinucleotide (NADH), and a proton. Its products are 3-mercapto-2-mercaptomethylpropanoic acid and oxidised NAD^{+}.

This enzyme belongs to the family of oxidoreductases, specifically those acting on a sulfur group of donors with NAD+ or NADP+ as acceptor. The systematic name of this enzyme class is 3-mercapto-2-mercaptomethylpropanoate:NAD+ oxidoreductase. Other names in common use include asparagusate dehydrogenase, asparagusic dehydrogenase, asparagusate reductase (NADH2), and NADH2:asparagusate oxidoreductase.
