= Asparagusic acid =

Organosulfur compound

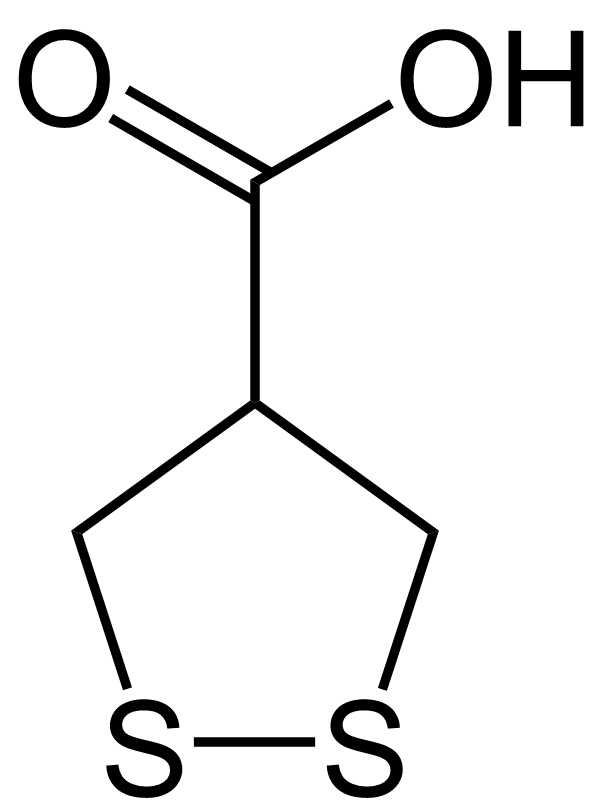
Asparagusic acid
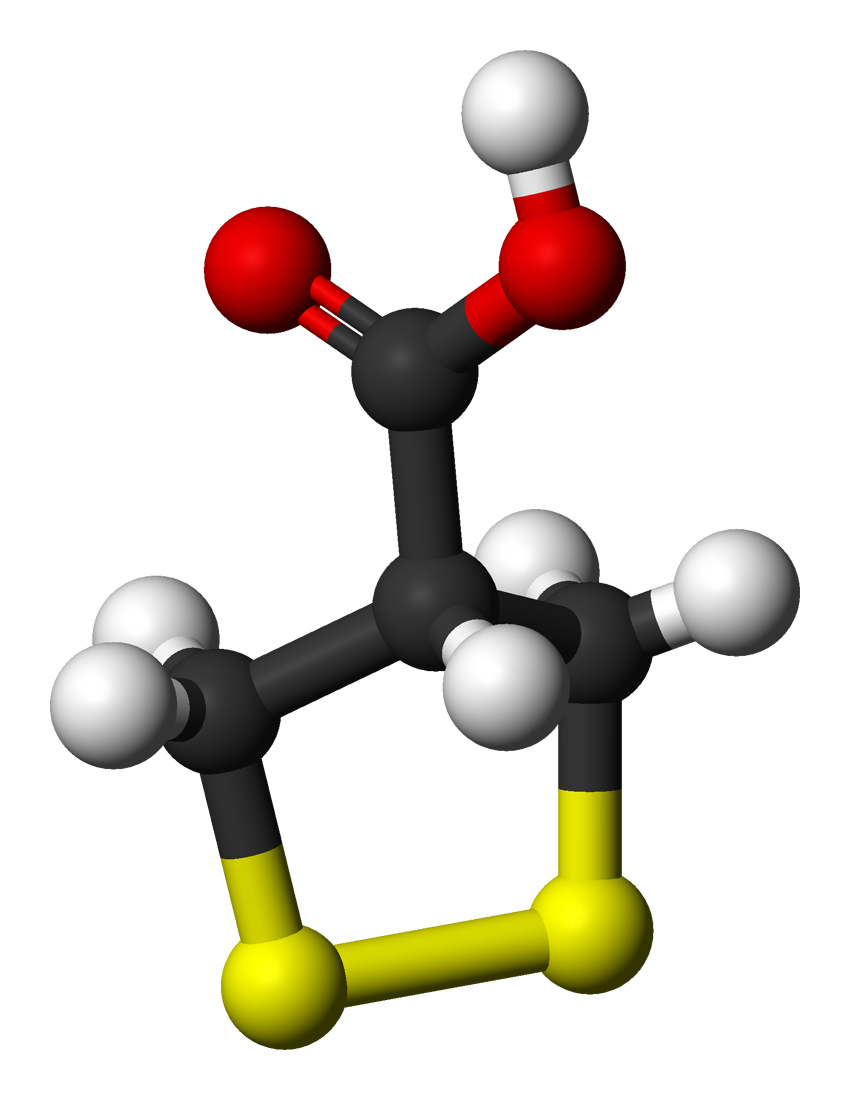
Asparagusic acid

Names
- Preferred IUPAC name 1,2-Dithiolane-4-carboxylic acid
- Other names 1,2-Dithiacyclopentane-4-carboxylic acid

Identifiers
CAS Number	2224-02-4
3D model (JSmol)	Interactive image
ChEBI	CHEBI:18091
ChemSpider	15819
KEGG	C01892
PubChem CID	16682
UNII	VAD3XV509R
CompTox Dashboard (EPA)	DTXSID00176779
- InChI: InChI=1S/C4H6O2S2/c5-4(6)3-1-7-8-2-3/h3H,1-2H2,(H,5,6) Key: AYGMEFRECNWRJC-UHFFFAOYSA-N; InChI=1/C4H6O2S2/c5-4(6)3-1-7-8-2-3/h3H,1-2H2,(H,5,6) Key: AYGMEFRECNWRJC-UHFFFAOYAA
- SMILES: O=C(O)C1CSSC1

Properties
Chemical formula	C_{4}H_{6}O_{2}S_{2}
Molar mass	150.21 g·mol^{−1}
Appearance	Colorless solid
Density	1.50 g cm^{−3}
Melting point	75.7 to 76.5 °C (168.3 to 169.7 °F; 348.8 to 349.6 K)
Boiling point	323.9 °C (615.0 °F; 597.0 K) at 760mmHg

Hazards
Flash point	149.7 °C (301.5 °F; 422.8 K)
- Except where otherwise noted, data are given for materials in their standard state (at 25 °C [77 °F], 100 kPa). verify (what is ?) Infobox references

Asparagusic acid is an organosulfur compound with the molecular formula C_{4}H_{6}O_{2}S_{2} and systematically named 1,2-dithiolane-4-carboxylic acid. The molecule consists of a heterocyclic disulfide functional group (a 1,2-dithiolane) with a carboxylic acid side chain. It is found in asparagus and is believed to be the metabolic precursor to odorous sulfur compounds responsible for the distinctive smell of urine which has long been associated with eating asparagus.

== Isolation and biosynthesis ==
The material was originally isolated from an aqueous extract of Asparagus officinalis, a spring vegetable. It is a derivative of the cyclic disulfide organic compound 1,2-dithiolane with a carboxylic acid functional group bound to carbon-4 of the heterocycle. Biosynthetic studies revealed that asparagusic acid is derived from isobutyric acid. Asparagusic acid is a colorless solid with a melting point of 75.7–76.5 °C, higher than that of the corresponding dithiol: dihydroasparagusic acid (or γ,γ-dimercaptoisobutyric acid), at 59.5–60.5 °C.

== Laboratory synthesis ==
A convenient synthesis of asparagusic acid has been developed from a commercially available diethyl malonate derivative starting material, improving on the prior method of nutrition researcher Eugene F. Jansen. Diethyl bis(hydroxymethyl)malonate is treated with hydroiodic acid to yield β,β'-diiodoisobutyric acid after decarboxylation and ester hydrolysis (with removal of volatile ethanol and carbon dioxide). Dihydroasparagusic acid, the reduced (dithiol) form of asparagusic acid, is produced by sequential reaction with sodium trithiocarbonate (Na_{2}CS_{3}) and sulfuric acid; subsequent oxidation with hot dimethyl sulfoxide yields asparagusic acid.

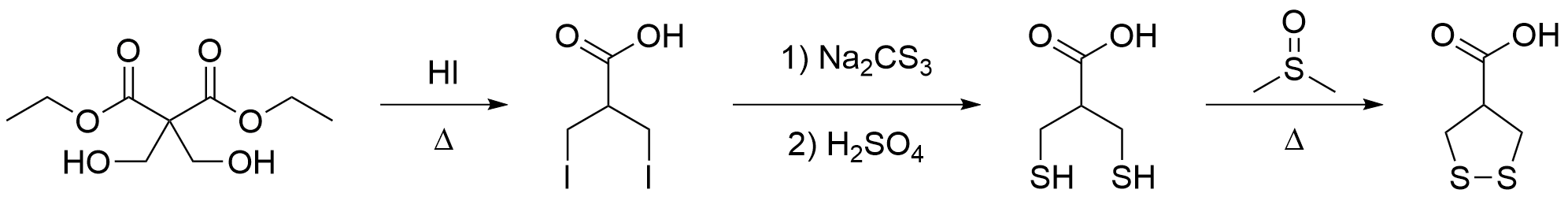

== Effect on urine ==
Observations that eating asparagus results in a detectable change in the odour of urine have been recorded over time. In 1702, Louis Lémery noted "a powerful and disagreeable smell in the urine", whilst John Arbuthnot noted that "asparagus ... affects the urine with a foetid smell." Benjamin Franklin described the odour as "disagreable", whilst Marcel Proust claimed that asparagus "transforms my chamber-pot into a flask of perfume." As early as 1891, Marceli Nencki had attributed the smell to methanethiol. The odour is attributed to a mixture of sulfur-containing metabolites of asparagusic acid.

The origin of asparagus urine is asparagusic acid, a substance unique to this vegetable. Most studies of the compounds responsible for the odour of asparagus urine have correlated the appearance of the compounds above with asparagus consumption; they appear as little as 15 minutes after consumption. However, this does not provide information on the biochemical processes that lead to their formation.

Asparagusic acid and lipoic acid are similar in that both possess a 1,2-dithiolane ring with a carboxylic acid tethered to it; indeed, it has been reported that asparagusic acid can substitute for lipoic acid in α-keto-acid oxidation systems such as the citric acid cycle. The (R)-(+)-enantiomer of α-lipoic acid is a cofactor in the pyruvate dehydrogenase complex and is essential for aerobic metabolism. The degradation pathway of lipoic acid has been well studied and includes evidence of reduction of the disulfide bridge, S-methylation, and oxidation to produce sulfoxides. Similar transformations of asparagusic acid would lead to metabolites like this detected in asparagus urine. Synthetic work has confirmed the relative ease of oxidation of asparagusic acid to yield S-oxides of the dithiolane ring. The rate of degradation appears highly variably between subjects; the typical half-life for odour disappearance is around 4 h with a between subject variability of 43.4%.

In the small minority of people who do not produce these metabolites after consuming asparagus, the reason may be as simple as asparagusic acid not being taken into the body from the digestive tract or that these individuals metabolise it in such a way as to minimise the release of volatile sulfur-containing products.
