= Nereistoxin =

Names
- Preferred IUPAC name N,N-Dimethyl-1,2-dithiolan-4-amine
- Other names NTX

Identifiers
| CAS Number | Nereistoxin: 1631-58-9; Cartap: 15263-53-3; Bensultap: 17606-31-4 |
| 3D model (JSmol) | Nereistoxin: Interactive image; Cartap: Interactive image |
| ChEBI | Nereistoxin: CHEBI:7521; Cartap: CHEBI:3436; Bensultap: CHEBI:39188 |
| ChemSpider | Nereistoxin: 14661; Cartap: 25279; Bensultap: 78640 |
| EC Number | Cartap: 239-309-2 |
| KEGG | Cartap: C11080; Bensultap: C18563 |
| PubChem CID | Cartap: 27159; Bensultap: 87176 |
| UNII | Cartap: Z45YUY784H; Bensultap: 145Q2E77PJ |
| CompTox Dashboard (EPA) | Nereistoxin: DTXSID0075104 |
- InChI: Nereistoxin: InChI=1S/C5H11NS2/c1-6(2)5-3-7-8-4-5/h5H,3-4H2,1-2H3 Key: DSOOGBGKEWZRIH-UHFFFAOYSA-N; Cartap: InChI=1S/C7H15N3O2S2/c1-10(2)5(3-13-6(8)11)4-14-7(9)12/h5H,3-4H2,1-2H3,(H2,8,11)(H2,9,12) Key: IRUJZVNXZWPBMU-UHFFFAOYSA-N; Bensultap: Key: YFXPPSKYMBTNAV-UHFFFAOYSA-N
- SMILES: Nereistoxin: CN(C)C1CSSC1; Cartap: CN(C)C(CSC(=O)N)CSC(=O)N

Properties
| Chemical formula | C_{5}H_{11}NS_{2} |
| Molar mass | 149.27 g·mol^{−1} |
- Except where otherwise noted, data are given for materials in their standard state (at 25 °C [77 °F], 100 kPa). Infobox references

Nereistoxin is a natural product identified in 1962 as the toxic organic compound N,N-dimethyl-1,2-dithiolan-4-amine. It had first been isolated in 1934 from the marine annelid Lumbriconereis heteropoda and acts by blocking the nicotinic acetylcholine receptor. Researchers at Takeda in Japan investigated it as a possible insecticide. They subsequently developed a number of derivatives that were commercialised, including those with the ISO common names bensultap, cartap, thiocyclam and thiosultap.

== Structures and synthesis ==
Cartap

Bensultap

Thiosultap

Thiocyclam

Bensultap (R=SO_{2}Ph) was made by the reaction of the sodium salt of benzenethiolsulfonate (PhSO_{2}SNa) with N,N-dimethyl 1,3-dichloro-2-propylamine or N,N-dimethyl 2,3-dichloropropylamine in ethanol.

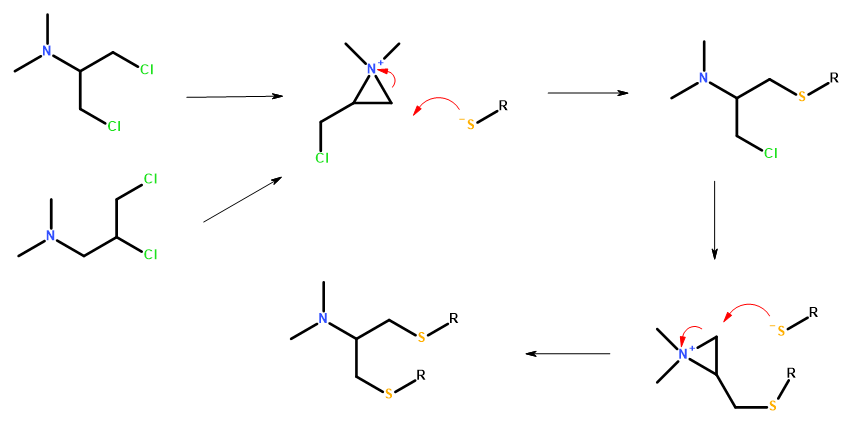

Bensultap can be converted to nereistoxin by treatment with alkali.

== History ==
Japanese fishermen used the annelid worm Lumbriconereis heteropoda as bait but after accidental human poisonings the chemical agent responsible was identified and named nereistoxin. In the 1960s, researchers at Takeda Chemical Industries synthesised the active material N,N-dimethyl-1,2-dithiolan-4-amine and derivatives in which the sulfur-sulfur bond of the 1,2-dithiolane ring was replaced by alternative sulfur-linked groups. The resulting compounds were in many cases less toxic to mammals than the natural product while retaining good activity on insects. It was subsequently shown that all the compounds which were commercialised acted by being propesticides — breaking down in the environment to nereistoxin or a toxic dithiol.

== Mechanism of action ==
Nereistoxin has chemical similarity to acetylcholine and its mode of action was suggested originally as being possibly by interference with acetylcholinesterase. Later electrophysiological studies using synapses from the cockroach Periplaneta americana showed that it acts by blocking the nicotinic acetylcholine receptor / ion channel complex in the insect central nervous system. This is also the mode of action of the related insecticides, all of which can produce the dithiol corresponding to cleavage of the 1,2-thiolane ring in the parent compound.

== Usage ==
None of the insecticidal analogues of nereistoxin became major products in agriculture and their use was mainly limited to Japanese and Chinese cultivation of rice, where their control of pests such as the rice stem borer Chilo suppressalis was significant. They were not licensed for use in Europe or the USA. The limited success of this group of chemicals was partly due to other compounds having similar modes of action but higher potency and mammalian safety becoming available.
