= 1,1-Ethanedithiol =

Chemical compound CH3CH(SH)2

Ethane-1,1-dithiol
Ethane-1,1-dithiol
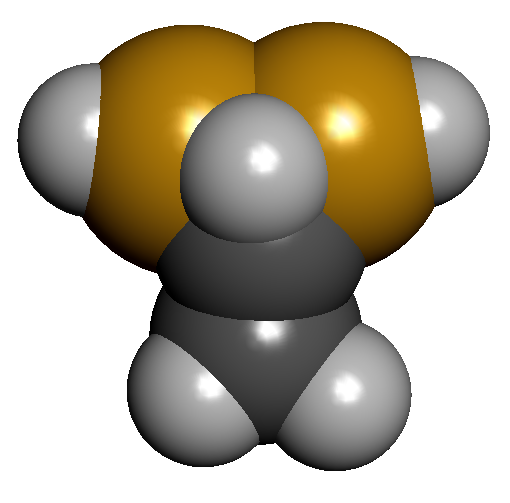
Ball-and-stick model of ethane-1,1-dithiol

Names
- Preferred IUPAC name Ethane-1,1-dithiol
- Other names Methyldisulfanyl methane 1,1-Ethanedithiol

Identifiers
CAS Number	69382-62-3
3D model (JSmol)	Interactive image
ChemSpider	31030
ECHA InfoCard	100.166.839
EC Number	248-103-1
PubChem CID	33645
UNII	6E52Q3WL23
CompTox Dashboard (EPA)	DTXSID10989195
- InChI: InChI=1S/C2H6S2/c1-2(3)4/h2-4H,1H3 Key: DHBXNPKRAUYBTH-UHFFFAOYSA-N
- SMILES: SC(S)C

Properties
Chemical formula	C_{2}H_{6}S_{2}
Molar mass	94.19 g·mol^{−1}
Appearance	Colorless liquid
Density	0.83 g/cm^{3}
Boiling point	71 °C (160 °F; 344 K)
Solubility in water	12.97 g/L
Solubility in water	Good solubility in most organic solvents
Refractive index (n_{D})	1.37

Hazards
- GHS labelling
Pictograms	(GHS07: Exclamation mark)
Signal word	Warning
Hazard statements	H302, H312, H332
Precautionary statements	P261, P264, P270, P271, P280, P301+P312, P302+P352, P304+P312, P304+P340, P312, P322, P330, P363, P501

Related compounds
Related thiols	Ethanethiol; Methanedithiol; 1,2-Ethanedithiol; 1,1,1-Ethanetrithiol; 1-hydroxy-ethanethiol; propane-1,1-dithiol
- Except where otherwise noted, data are given for materials in their standard state (at 25 °C [77 °F], 100 kPa). verify (what is ?) Infobox references

Ethane-1,1-dithiol is an organosulfur compound with formula CH_{3}CH(SH)_{2}. It is a colourless smelly liquid that is added to or found in some foods. The compound is an example of a geminal dithiol.

== Use ==
Flavouring uses of ethane-1,1-dithiol may include drinks, oil, gravy, soup, meat, fruit, seasonings, and snacks. Maximum concentrations in use that are generally recognised as safe (GRAS) is five parts per million (ppm) but typical uses are around 0.2 ppm. It is supplied as a 1% solution in ethanol, due to its strong offensive smell. In the diluted form with 4% ethyl acetate and ethanol the CAS number is 69382-62-3. Toxicity may be due to metabolism products hydrogen sulfide and acetaldehyde, however as used it has a margin of safety of over 10,000,000. Other ways that it is modified in the body apart from hydrolysis is methylation to 1-methylsulfanyl-ethanethiol, oxidation of the sulfur to an ethyl sulfonate, glucuronidation of the sulfur, or combination with cysteine by way of a disulfide bridge.

=== Identifiers ===
Since it is used in the food industry there are codes issued by various authorities. It is identified as JECFA number 1660. The Flavor and Extract Manufacturers Association (FEMA) id is 4111. The European designation for the flavouring is Fl 12.293.

== Natural occurrence ==
It can be produced during fermentation of grapes. It is used as a food flavouring.

It is found naturally in the scent of durian.

== Properties ==
The nuclear magnetic resonance spectrum shows three environments for protons, in the ratio of 3:2:1 corresponding to CH_{3} SH and CH.

=== Reactions ===
Ethane-1,1-dithiol has several reactions known that are important in white wine flavours. In the presence of oxygen, ethane-1,1-dithiol is converted to cis/trans-3,6-dimethyl-1,2,4,5-tetrathiane which has a rubbery aroma. This molecule has a ring with four sulfur atoms and two carbons, two ethane-1,1-dithiol molecules become linked at their sulfur atoms with the loss of hydrogen. This can further oxidise to cis/trans-3,5-dimethyl-1,2,4-trithiolane, which has a meat-like odour.

Ethane-1,1-dithiol reacts with hydrogen sulfide to form cis/trans-4,7-dimethyl-1,2,3,5,6-pentathiepane, a ring containing five sulfur atoms and two carbons. This has a meaty smell.

=== Formation ===
Ethane-1,1-dithiol can be formed in the reaction of acetaldehyde with hydrogen sulfide. 1-Hydroxyethanethiol is formed as an intermediary.

== See also ==
- Ethane-1,2-dithiol
