= Dithiolane =

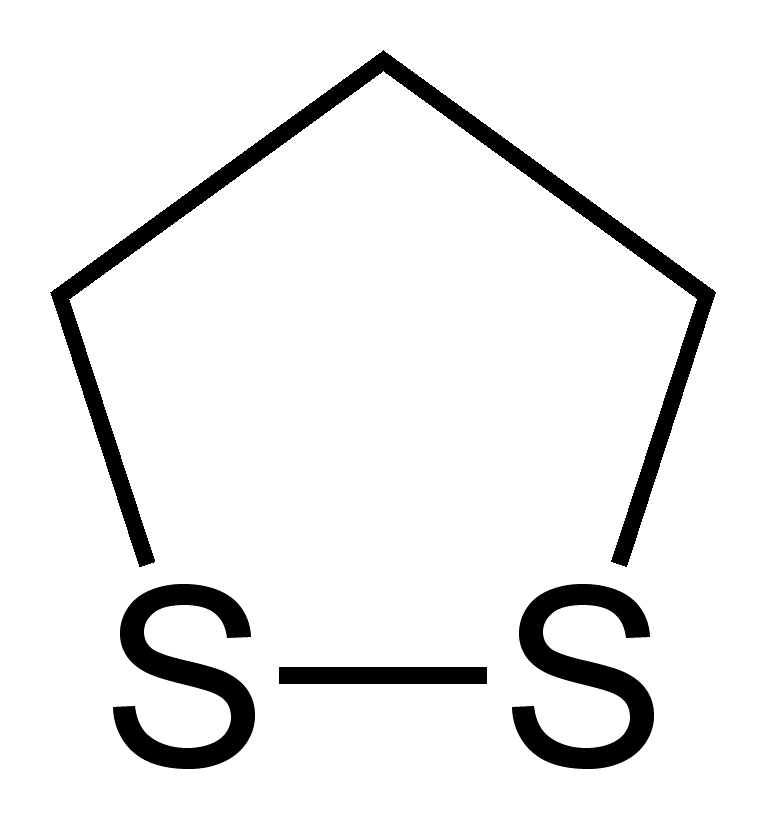
Skeletal formula of 1,2-dithiolane

Dithiolane may refer to:

- 1,2-Dithiolane
- 1,3-Dithiolane
