= 1,2-Dithiolane =

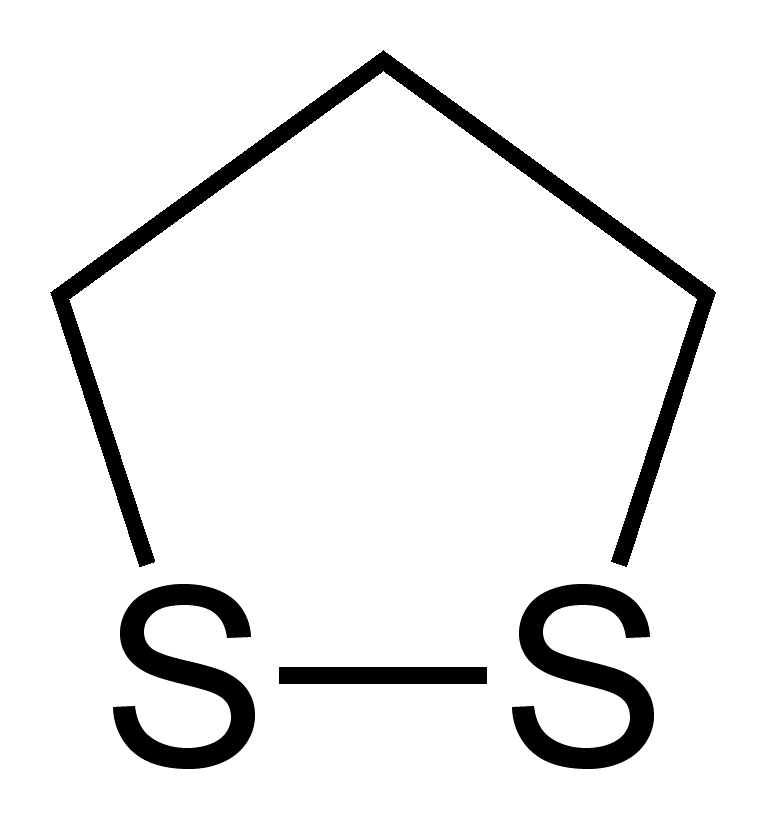

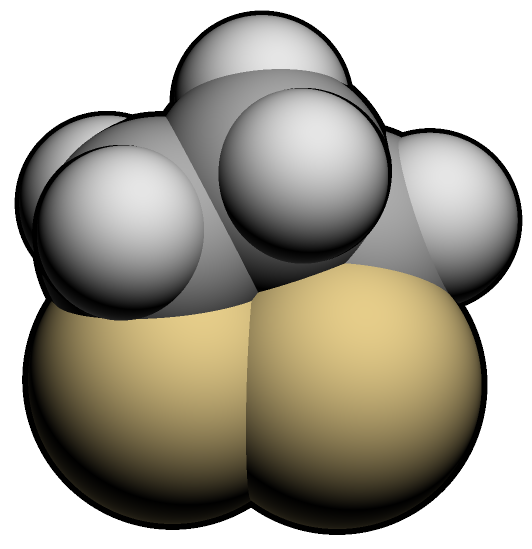

Names
- Preferred IUPAC name 1,2-Dithiolane

Identifiers
CAS Number	557-22-2
3D model (JSmol)	Interactive image
Beilstein Reference	102454
ChEBI	CHEBI:38226
ChemSpider	71377
Gmelin Reference	1029938
PubChem CID	79045
UNII	6DE8XWQ974
CompTox Dashboard (EPA)	DTXSID30204231
- InChI: InChI=1S/C3H6S2/c1-2-4-5-3-1/h1-3H2 Key: MUZIZEZCKKMZRT-UHFFFAOYSA-N
- SMILES: S1SCCC1

Properties
Chemical formula	C_{3}H_{6}S_{2}
Molar mass	106.20 g·mol^{−1}

Related compounds
Related compounds	Ethane-1,2-dithiol
- Except where otherwise noted, data are given for materials in their standard state (at 25 °C [77 °F], 100 kPa). verify (what is ?) Infobox references

1,2-Dithiolane is an organosulfur compound with the formula S_{2}(CH_{2})_{3}. It is also classified as a heterocycle derived from cyclopentane by replacing two methylene bridges (−CH_{2}− units) with a disulfide group. 1,3-Dithiolane is an isomer. The parent molecule is unimportant but substituted derivatives, especially lipoic acid and its derivatives, are often essential for life. Several occur naturally.

The parent 1,2-dithiolane is the disulfide derived from 1,3-propanedithiol. It is however unstable with respect to oligomerization. In general, 1,3-dithiols are superior reductants relative to monothiols.

== Natural occurrence ==
Many substituted 1,2-dithiolates are found in nature. The most common is lipoic acid, a chiral dithiolane, which features a pentanoic acid substituent. It is essential for aerobic metabolism in mammals.

Some 1,2-dithiolane are found in some foods, such as asparagusic acid in asparagus. The 4-dimethylamino derivative nereistoxin was the inspiration for insecticides that act by blocking the nicotinic acetylcholine receptor.

Several alkyl-substituted 1,2-dithiolanes occur in the scent glands of skunks and related mammals. These include 3,3-dimethyl-, 3-propyl-, 3-ethyl-1,2-dithiolane, and others.

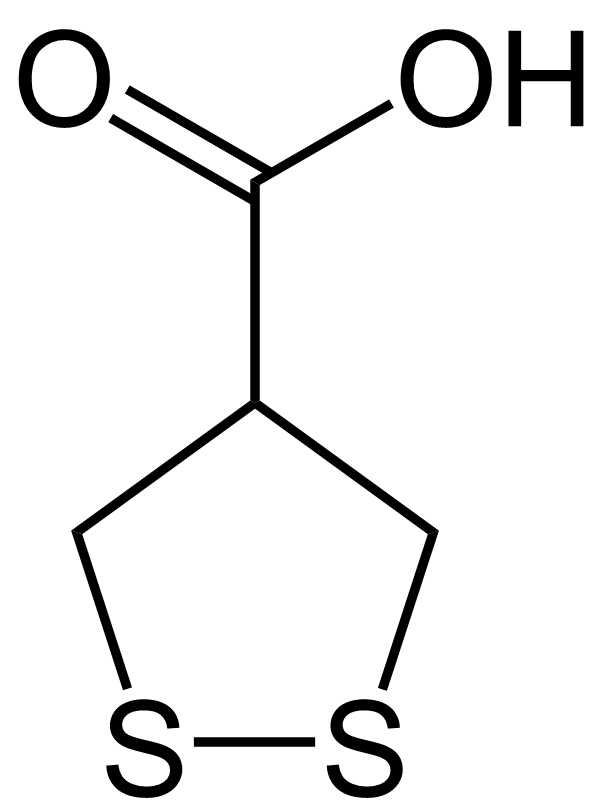
Asparagusic acid

Nereistoxin, inspiration for cartap and bensultap

Lipoic acid

Gerrardine, found in Cassipourea guianensis

Charatoxin, found in chara globuluris

== Dithiolane-S-oxides ==
Isomers of brugierol

Many 1,2-dithiolanes can be oxidized to their S-oxides, which are chiral.
