= 1,2-Ethanedithiol =

Chemical compound C2H4(SH)2

Ethane-1,2-dithiol
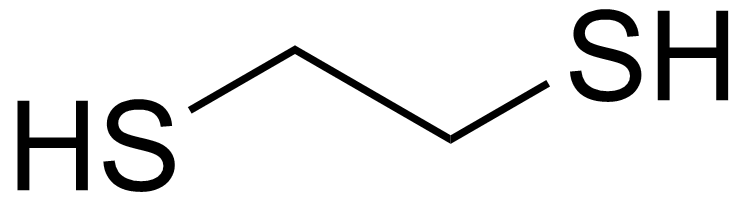
- Ethane-1,2-dithiol

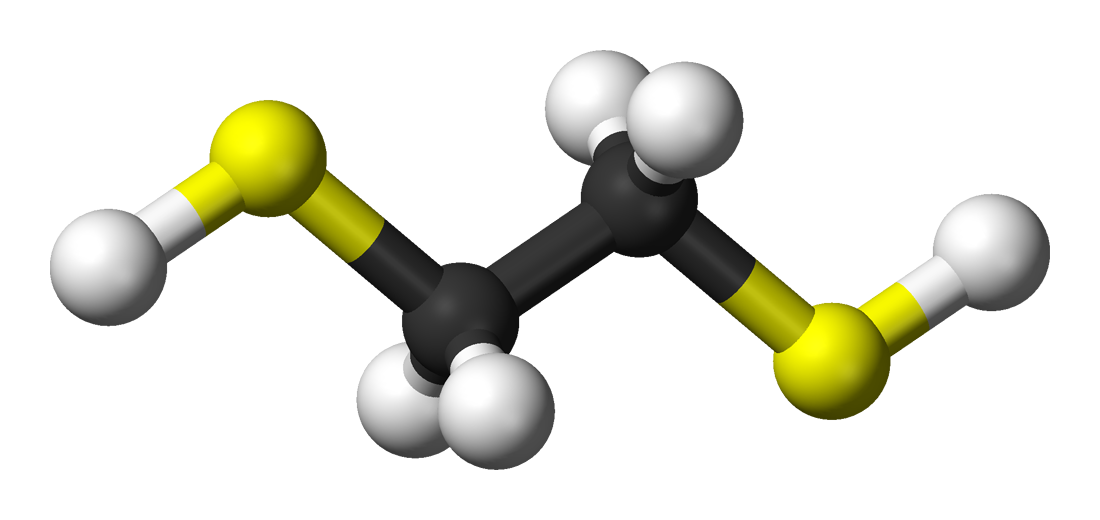
- Ball-and-stick model of ethane-1,2-dithiol

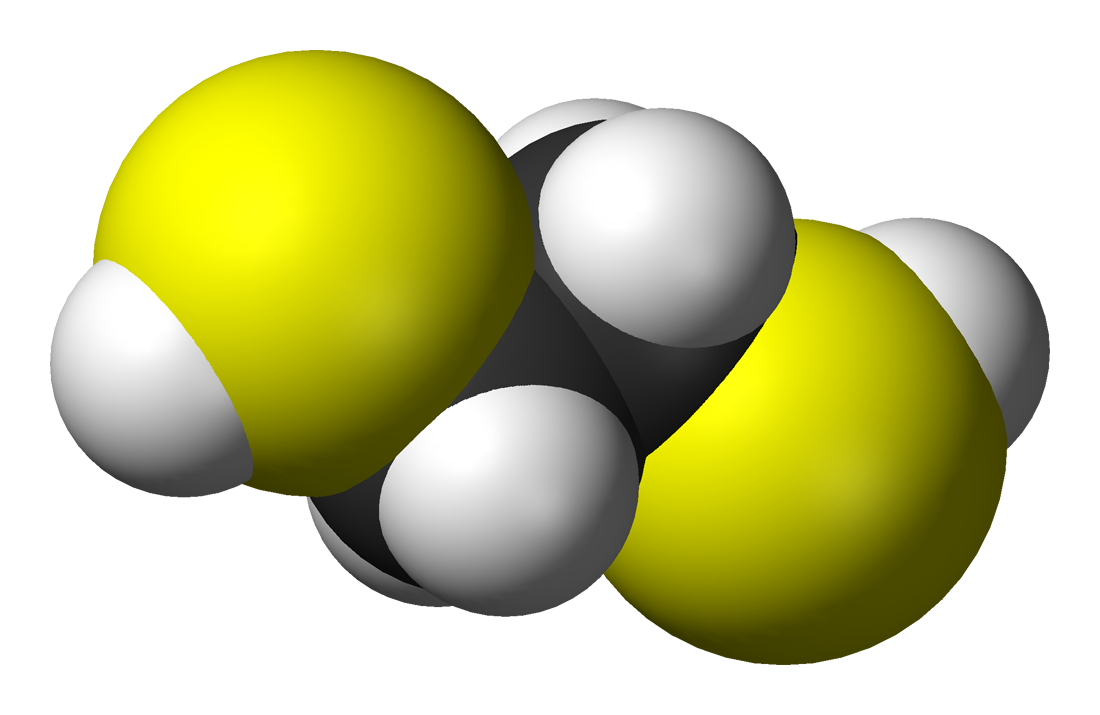
- Space-filling model of ethane-1,2-dithiol

Names
- Preferred IUPAC name Ethane-1,2-dithiol
- Other names Dimercaptoethane; 1,2-Ethanedithiol

Identifiers
CAS Number	540-63-6
3D model (JSmol)	Interactive image
ChemSpider	13865015
ECHA InfoCard	100.007.958
EC Number	208-752-3
PubChem CID	10902
RTECS number	KI3325000
UNII	92T634FLAR
CompTox Dashboard (EPA)	DTXSID9052187
- InChI: InChI=1S/C2H6S2/c3-1-2-4/h3-4H,1-2H2 Key: VYMPLPIFKRHAAC-UHFFFAOYSA-N; InChI=1/C2H6S2/c3-1-2-4/h3-4H,1-2H2 Key: VYMPLPIFKRHAAC-UHFFFAOYAA
- SMILES: SCCS

Properties
Chemical formula	C_{2}H_{6}S_{2}
Molar mass	94.19 g·mol^{−1}
Appearance	Colorless liquid
Density	1.123 g/cm^{3}
Melting point	−41 °C (−42 °F; 232 K)
Boiling point	146 °C (295 °F; 419 K) 46 mmHg
Solubility in water	Slightly sol
Solubility in other solvents	Good solubility in most organic solvents
Acidity (pK_{a})	≈11
Refractive index (n_{D})	1.5589 (D-line, 25 °C)

Hazards
- GHS labelling
Pictograms	(GHS02: Flammable) (GHS06: Toxic) (GHS07: Exclamation mark)
Signal word	Danger
Hazard statements	H226, H301, H302, H310, H312, H319, H330
Precautionary statements	P210, P233, P240, P241, P242, P243, P260, P262, P264, P270, P271, P280, P284, P301+P310, P301+P312, P302+P350, P302+P352, P303+P361+P353, P304+P340, P305+P351+P338, P310, P312, P320, P321, P330, P337+P313, P361, P363, P370+P378, P403+P233, P403+P235, P405, P501
NFPA 704 (fire diamond)	2 2
Flash point	50 °C (122 °F; 323 K)

Related compounds
Related thiols	1,1-Ethanedithiol; Ethanethiol; 1,3-Propanedithiol; 1,2-Benzenedithiol; Thiophenol
- Except where otherwise noted, data are given for materials in their standard state (at 25 °C [77 °F], 100 kPa). verify (what is ?) Infobox references

Ethane-1,2-dithiol, also known as EDT, is a colorless liquid with the formula C_{2}H_{4}(SH)_{2}. It has a very characteristic odor which is compared by many people to rotten cabbage. It is a common building block in organic synthesis and an excellent ligand for metal ions.

== Preparation ==
Ethane-1,2-dithiol is made commercially by the reaction of 1,2-dichloroethane with aqueous sodium bisulfide. In the laboratory, it can also be prepared by the action of 1,2-dibromoethane on thiourea followed by hydrolysis.

== Reactions ==
1,2-Ethanedithiol is a weak acid, typical of alkyl thiols. In the presence of base and an alkylating agent, 1,2-ethanedithiol converts to thioethers:

HS(CH_{2})_{2}SH + 2 NR_{3} + 2 R'I → R'S(CH_{2})_{2}SR' + 2 [R_{3}NH]I

Oxidation of 1,2-ethanedithiol gives a series of oligomers, including the cyclic bis(disulfide).

As a 1,2-dithiol, this compound reacts with aldehydes and ketones to give 1,3-dithiolanes, which can be useful intermediates.

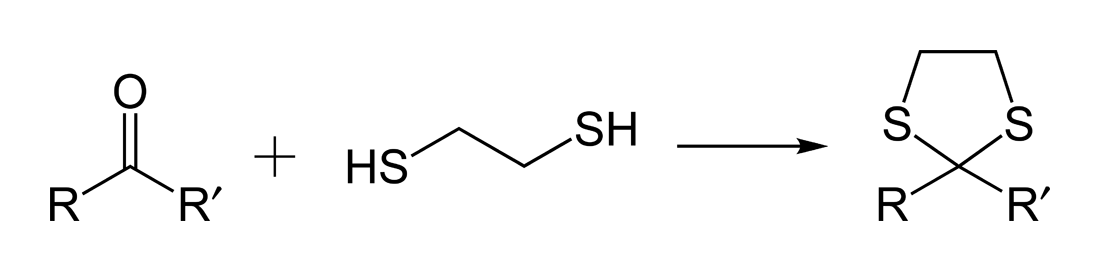
Protecting a carbonyl group by converting it to a 1,3-dithiolane, using ethane-1,2-dithiol

Other 1,2- and 1,3-dithiols give related 1,3-dithiolanes (five-membered) and 1,3-dithianes (six-membered rings). Diols such as ethylene glycol undergo analogous reactions to give 1,3-dioxolanes. One distinguishing feature of the dithiolanes and dithianes derived from aldehydes is that the methyne group can be deprotonated and the resulting carbanion alkylated.

1,2-Ethanedithiol has been used as a scavenger in peptide cleavage synthesis.

Like 1,3-propanedithiol, 1,2-ethanedithiol readily forms metal thiolate complexes. Illustrative is the synthesis of the derivative diiron ethanedithiolate hexacarbonyl upon reaction with triiron dodecacarbonyl:

Fe_{3}(CO)_{12} + C_{2}H_{4}(SH)_{2} → Fe_{2}(S_{2}C_{2}H_{4})(CO)_{6} + H_{2} + Fe(CO)_{5} + CO

== See also ==
- Ethane-1,1-dithiol
