= 1,3-Dithiolane =

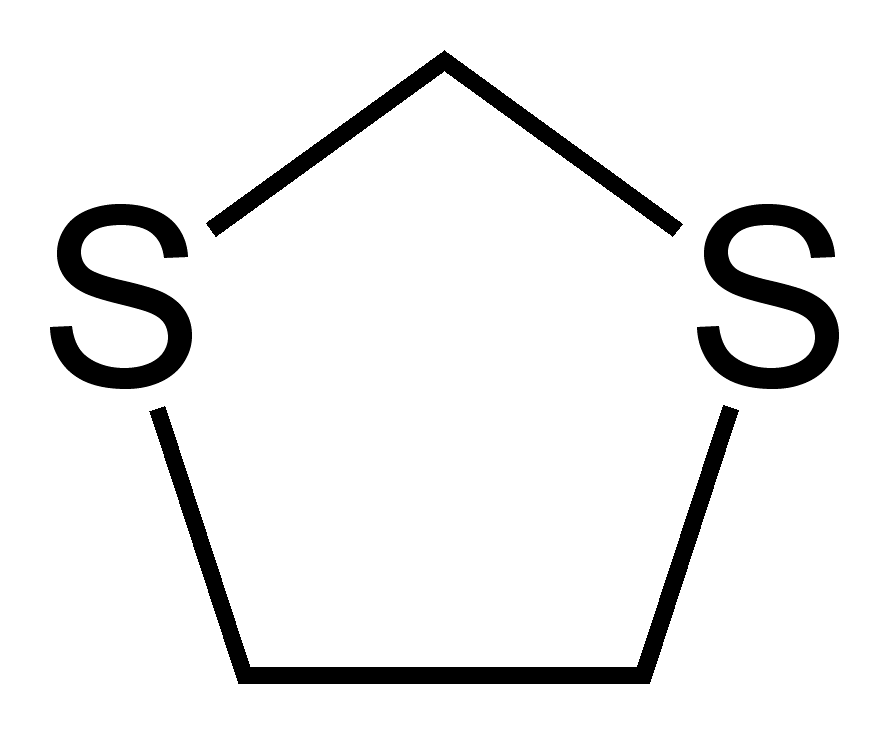

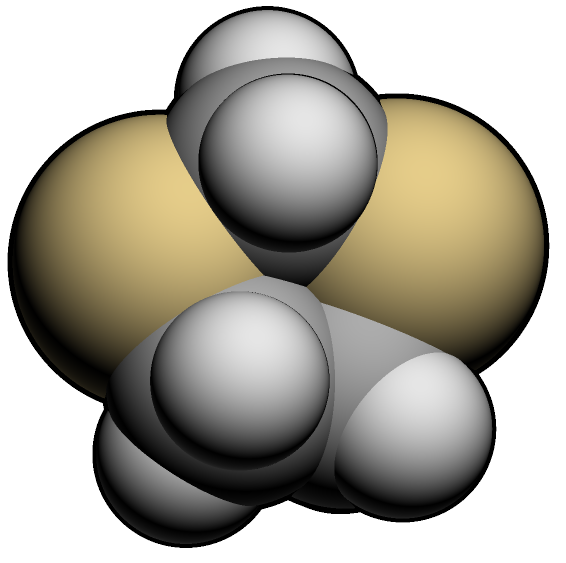

Names
- Preferred IUPAC name 1,3-Dithiolane

Identifiers
CAS Number	4829-04-3
3D model (JSmol)	Interactive image
Beilstein Reference	102455
ChEBI	CHEBI:38079
ChemSpider	19727
Gmelin Reference	82036
PubChem CID	20970
UNII	341G58G6YL
CompTox Dashboard (EPA)	DTXSID90197473
- InChI: InChI=1S/C3H6S2/c1-2-4-5-3-1/h1-3H2 Key: MUZIZEZCKKMZRT-UHFFFAOYSA-N
- SMILES: C1CSCS1

Properties
Chemical formula	C_{3}H_{6}S_{2}
Molar mass	106.20 g·mol^{−1}

Related compounds
Related compounds	Ethane-1,2-dithiol
- Except where otherwise noted, data are given for materials in their standard state (at 25 °C [77 °F], 100 kPa). Infobox references

1,3-Dithiolane is the organosulfur compound with the formula CH_{2}S_{2}C_{2}H_{4}. Also classified as a heterocycle related cyclopentane by replacing two methylene bridges (−CH_{2}− units) with thioether groups. It is an isomer of 1,2-dithiolane. 1,3-Dithiolanes are compounds where one or more H atoms of the parent 1,3-dithiolane are replaced by other groups. These species are more widely studied.

== Synthesis ==
A common family of 1,3-dithiolanes have the formula RCHS_{2}C_{2}H_{4}. They are obtained by treating an aldehyde with 1,2-ethanedithiol. Related compounds with the formula R_{2}CS_{2}C_{2}H_{4} are obtained by condensation of 1,2-ethanedithiol with ketones. The dithiolane protected aldehydes and ketones are amenable to many reactions without perturbing the dithiolane ring.

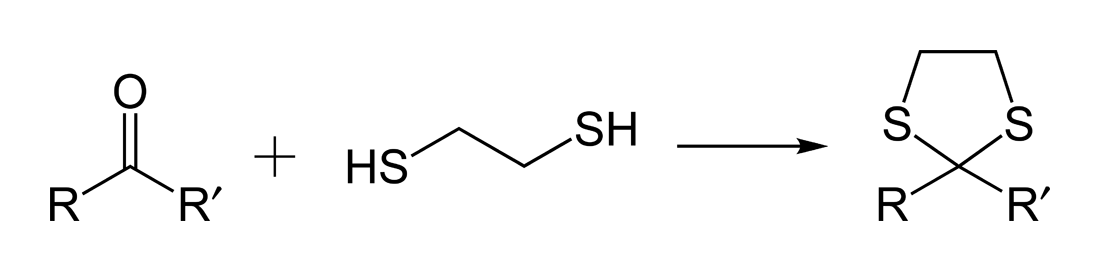
Protecting a carbonyl group by converting it to a 1,3-dithiolane, using 1,2-ethanedithiol

Dithiolanes can often be reverted, i.e., deprotected, to the parent aldehyde and ketone. A variety of reagents have been developed for that purpose.

== Reactions ==
1,3-Dithiolanes derived from aldehydes can be deprotonated:

RCHS_{2}C_{2}H_{4} + BuLi → RCLiS_{2}C_{2}H_{4} + BuH

These organolithium compounds degrade with loss of ethylene to give the dithiocarboxylate:

RCLiS_{2}C_{2}H_{4} → RCS_{2}Li + C_{2}H_{4}

In contrast, 2-lithio-1,3-dithianes (RCLiS_{2}C_{3}H_{6}) are long-lived.

1,3-Dithiolanes are susceptible to a variety of degradation processes involving organometallic reagents leading to other organosulfur compounds.
