= Methanedithiol =

Chemical compound H2C(SH)2

Names
- Preferred IUPAC name Methanedithiol
- Other names Dimercaptomethane

Identifiers
CAS Number	6725-64-0
3D model (JSmol)	Interactive image
ChemSpider	122421
ECHA InfoCard	100.166.842
PubChem CID	138818
UNII	LSC543N4PH
CompTox Dashboard (EPA)	DTXSID50217580
- InChI: InChI=1S/CH4S2/c2-1-3/h2-3H,1H2 Key: INBDPOJZYZJUDA-UHFFFAOYSA-N
- SMILES: SCS

Properties
Chemical formula	CH_{4}S_{2}
Molar mass	80.16 g·mol^{−1}
Appearance	Colorless liquid
Boiling point	58 °C (136 °F; 331 K)
Refractive index (n_{D})	1.581

Hazards
- GHS labelling
Pictograms	(GHS02: Flammable)
Signal word	Warning
Hazard statements	H226
Precautionary statements	P210, P233, P240, P241, P242, P243, P280, P303+P361+P353, P370+P378, P403+P235, P501
- Except where otherwise noted, data are given for materials in their standard state (at 25 °C [77 °F], 100 kPa). Infobox references

Methanedithiol is an organosulfur compound with the formula H_{2}C(SH)_{2}. A seldom used chemical, it forms when formaldehyde reacts with hydrogen sulfide under pressure:

CH_{2}O + 2 H_{2}S → H_{2}C(SH)_{2} + H_{2}O

This reaction competes with formation of trithiane:

3 H_{2}C(SH)_{2} → [H_{2}CS]_{3} + 3 H_{2}S

Methanedithiol forms a solid dibenzoate derivative upon treatment with benzoic anhydride:

3 H_{2}C(SH)_{2} + 2 (C_{6}H_{5}CO)_{2}O → H_{2}C[SC(O)C_{6}H_{5}]_{2} + 2 C_{6}H_{5}CO_{2}H

Methanetrithiol is also known.
