= Louis Lémery =

French botanist and chemist (1677–1743)

Louis Lémery (25 January 1677, Paris, France – 9 June 1743, Paris) was a French botanist and chemist.

The son of scientist Nicolas Lemery, Louis was appointed physician at the Hôtel-Dieu de Paris in 1710, and became chemistry chair at the Jardin du Roi in 1730, succeeding Étienne François Geoffroy. He was the author of a Traité des aliments (1702), and of a Dissertation sur la nature des os (1704), as well as of a number of papers on chemical topics. He published papers on chemical analysis, monstrous births (birth defects) and the anatomy of fetuses.

In 1706, he married Catherine Chapot, with whom he had one daughter.
