= Benzene-1,2-dithiol =

- Skeletal formula

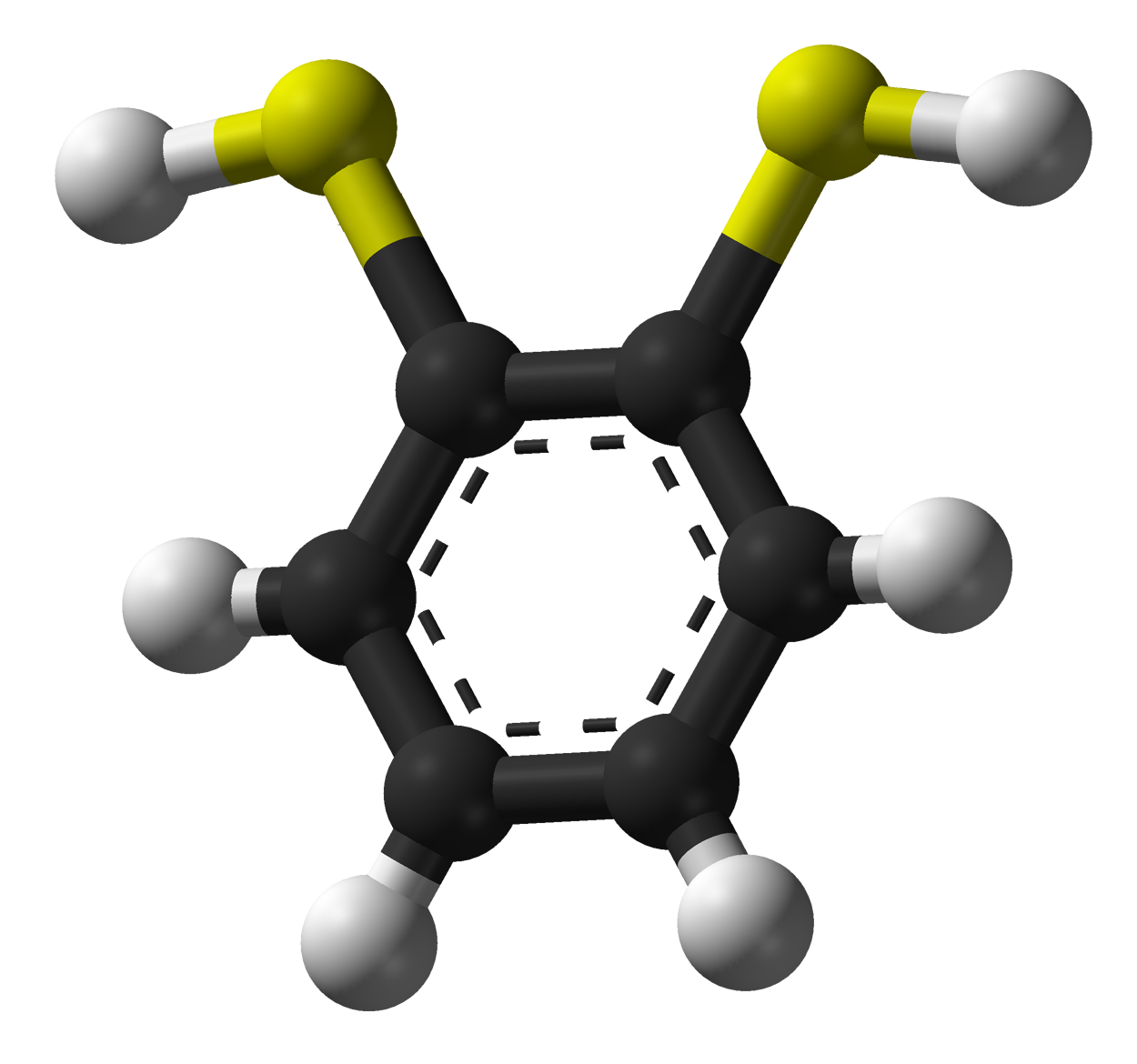
- Ball-and-stick model

Names
- Preferred IUPAC name Benzene-1,2-dithiol
- Other names 1,2-Dimercaptobenzene

Identifiers
CAS Number	17534-15-5
3D model (JSmol)	Interactive image; Interactive image
ChemSpider	13840080
ECHA InfoCard	100.037.740
PubChem CID	69370
UNII	F7M2QCZ9RB
CompTox Dashboard (EPA)	DTXSID20871274
- InChI: InChI=1S/C6H6S2/c7-5-3-1-2-4-6(5)8/h1-4,7-8H Key: JRNVQLOKVMWBFR-UHFFFAOYSA-N; InChI=1/C6H6S2/c7-5-3-1-2-4-6(5)8/h1-4,7-8H Key: JRNVQLOKVMWBFR-UHFFFAOYAM
- SMILES: C1=CC=C(C(=C1)S)S; Sc1ccccc1S

Properties
Chemical formula	C_{6}H_{6}S_{2}
Molar mass	142.23 g·mol^{−1}
Appearance	colourless liquid
Density	1.236 g/mL
Melting point	22 to 24 °C (72 to 75 °F; 295 to 297 K)
Boiling point	119 to 120 °C (246 to 248 °F; 392 to 393 K) at 17 mmHg
Solubility in water	Soluble in basic water

Hazards
- Occupational safety and health (OHS/OSH)
Main hazards	stench
Flash point	104.0 °C; 219.2 °F; 377.1 K
- Except where otherwise noted, data are given for materials in their standard state (at 25 °C [77 °F], 100 kPa). verify (what is ?) Infobox references

Benzene-1,2-dithiol is the organosulfur compound with the formula C_{6}H_{6}S_{2} or C_{6}H_{4}(SH)_{2}. This colourless viscous liquid consists of a benzene ring with a pair of adjacent thiol groups. The conjugate base of this diprotic compound serves as chelating agent in coordination chemistry and a building block for the synthesis of other organosulfur compounds.

== Synthesis ==
The compound is prepared by ortho-lithiation of benzenethiol using butyl lithium (BuLi) followed by sulfidation:

C_{6}H_{5}SH + 2 BuLi → C_{6}H_{4}SLi-2-Li + 2 BuH
C_{6}H_{4}SLi-2-Li + S → C_{6}H_{4}(SLi)_{2}
C_{6}H_{4}(SLi)_{2} + 2 HCl → C_{6}H_{4}(SH)_{2} + 2 LiCl

The compound was first prepared from 2-aminobenzenethiol via diazotization. Alternatively, it forms from 1,2-dibromobenzene.

== Reactions ==
Oxidation mainly affords the polymeric disulfide. Reaction with metal dihalides and metal oxides gives the dithiolate complexes of the formula L_{n}M(S_{2}C_{6}H_{4}) where L_{n}M represents a variety of metal centers, e.g. (C_{5}H_{5})_{2}Ti. Ketones and aldehydes condense to give the heterocycles called dithianes:

C_{6}H_{4}(SH)_{2} + RR’CO → C_{6}H_{4}(S)_{2}CRR’ + H_{2}O

== Related compounds ==
3,4-Toluenedithiol, also called dimercaptotoluene (CAS#496-74-2), behaves similarly to 1,2-benzenedithiol but is a solid at ambient temperatures (m.p. 135-137 °C).

Alkene-1,2-dithiols are unstable, although metal complexes of alkene-1,2-dithiolates, called dithiolene complexes, are well known.
