= C3H8S2 =

The molecular formula C_{3}H_{8}S_{2} (molar mass: 108.23 g/mol) may refer to:

- 2,4-Dithiapentane
- Propanedithiols
  - 1,2-Propanedithiol
  - 1,3-Propanedithiol
