= Learn Way =

2020–2022 South Korean television show

- Poster for season 1
- Hangul: 런웨이
- RR: Reonwei
- MR: Rŏnwei
- Genre: Self-development reality
- Directed by: Kim Ki-min; Lee Ga-ram; Kim Da-jung; Baek Gyeong-yeol; Lee Sang-min
- Presented by: Song Yuqi (Season 1); Mijoo (Season 2)
- Country of origin: South Korea
- Original language: Korean
- No. of seasons: 2
- No. of episodes: 60

Production
- Producer: Kim Ki-min (Kimkimi)
- Running time: 12 – 18 minutes
- Production company: Kakao M

Original release
- Network: KakaoTV; YouTube (international)
- Release: September 20, 2020 – February 25, 2022

Learn Way (Korean: 런웨이) is a South Korean variety show airing weekend on KakaoTV, which premiered every Sunday at 12 noon and a re-run on 1theK Originals' YouTube channel every Friday at 12 pm KST.

The first season aired from September 20, 2020 to May 2, 2021 hosted by (G)I-dle's Song Yuqi. The second season premiered on July 11, 2021 to February 25, 2022 hosted by Lovelyz's Mijoo.

== Overview ==
KakaoTV's original entertainment show Learn Way is a project that captures (G)I-dle's Song Yuqi process of being reborn as an 'all-rounder' by meeting with expert mentors in various fields. She is a self-proclaimed center, and visual who can dance and sing, and quickly becomes friends with anyone. In Learn Way, Yuqi will engage with various fields she has previously not interacted with much, connecting with mentors through special chemistry across ages, genres, and borders.

== Slogan ==
Main: 'Let's go! On the way to learning!'
Opening: 'Path of Learning, Learn Way'

== Host ==
- Song Yuqi ((G)I-dle) (Season 1)
- Mijoo (Lovelyz) (Season 2) (Note: Appeared as special guest for season 1, episode 29)

== Celebrity guest ==
Episode	Guest	Note
17	Jeon So-yeon ((G)I-dle)	Leader of (G)I-dle, producer, rapper and songwriter

== Episodes ==
Season	Episodes	Originally released	
Season	Episodes	First released	Last released
1	30	September 20, 2020	May 2, 2021
2	30	July 11, 2021	February 25, 2022
Special		January 24, 2021	

=== Season 1 (2020–2021) ===
No. overall	No. in season	Title	Mentor(s)	Occupation(s)	Original release date
1	1	"Learn Trot"	Park Hyun-woo	Veteran trot composer and singer-songwriter	September 20, 2020
Class/Period: Skill test. Beat practice. Wanppong. Making second character. Remarks: Song Yuqi as Yang Gwi-bi Location filming: Dongmyo
2	2	"How to Become a Newscaster"	Kim Il-jung	Former SBS broadcaster	September 27, 2020
Class/Period: Level test. Vocalization and pronunciation. Expression power development. Hosting an interview. Final test. Special appearance: Kim Ga-hyun, also the teaching assistant. Location filming: Sinsa-dong, Gangnam
3	3	"Learning Hip-hop"	Rhythm Power	Hip hop group	October 4, 2020
Class/Period: Ability test. One point lesson. Writing Lyrics, Uh-Oh remix ver. recording. Special appearances: Hangzoo, Boi B and Geegooin. Remarks: Uh-Oh remix version. Location filming: Nonhyeon-dong, Seoul
4	4	"Learning Hairdressing"	Woo Gi-woo	Hairdresser	October 11, 2020
Class/Period: Ability test. Shampooing. Styling. Cutting. Final practice.
5	5	"Yuqi as the Zookeeper"	Kim Hannah, Kim Shin-woo	Zookeepers	October 18, 2020
Class/Period: Cleaning the elephant grounds. Elephant's medical care. Feeding the wild guinea fowl. Meeting the giraffe. Final test. Location filming: Everland Resort
6	6	"Learning boxing"	Choi Hyun-mi	Professional boxer	October 25, 2020
Class/Period: Level test. Basic boxing training. Boxing fundamentals. Final mission. Location filming: Gangnam-gu
7	7	"Learning to B-boy"	Park In-soo (Kill)	B-Boy	November 1, 2020
Class/Period: Skills test. Basics of B-boying. B-boying power move. B-boying battle. Final performance. Special appearance: Kim Ye-ri (Yell), a B-Girl, choreographer and also the teaching assistant. Location filming: Samseong-dong
8	8	"Learning PUBG"	Hansia and EJ (Afreeca Freecs)	Professional gamer	November 8, 2020
Class/Period: Interview. Assessing competence. Training for team play. Racing competition.
9	9	"Learning Magic"	Nicky	Magician	November 15, 2020
Class/Period: Competence test. ESP magic. Magic performance. Magic gala show. Special appearance: (G)I-dle's Miyeon Location filming: Hapjeong-dong
10	10	"Learning Baseball"	Park Jin-hyung	Baseball player	November 22, 2020
Class/Period: Ability assessment test. Fitness test. Batting training. Pitching training. Final mission. Special appearance: Thegyusik, former baseball player and also the subordinate. Location filming: Gimpo
11	11	"Learning How to Make Pasta"	Fabry	Italian Michelin star chef	November 29, 2020
Class/Period: Cooking test. Learning to make carbonara. Learning how to make vongole. Pasta contest. Location filming: Sejong University
12	12	"Learning Krump"	Kim Sol-hee (Black Bomb)	Krump dancer	December 6, 2020
Class/Period: Ability assessment test. Excitement and expression. Hat trick. Krump battle. Final mission. Special appearance: Kim Mi-ji (Opera) and Kim Geum-ha (AXKIM), also the teaching assistants. Remarks: Lion dance krump version. Location filming: Sinsa-dong, Gangnam
13	13	"Learning Woodworking"	Eunyoung	Star technician	December 20, 2020 (Note: The film's production crew halted filming due to the COVID-19 pandemic resulting in no broadcast on December 13, 2020.)
Class/Period: Skill test. Learning about woodworking. Learning about design. Final test. Location filming: Seongsu-dong
14	14	"Learning Fusion Korean Food"	Jo Woo-hyun	Korea's 12th Master Chef	January 3, 2021 (Note: The film's production crew halted filming due to the COVID-19 pandemic resulting in no broadcast on December 27, 2020.)
Class/Period: The skill test. Fusion steak & risotto. Fusion pizza, The final mission. Location filming: Gomyeong Food Service High School
15	15	"Learning Rhythmic Gymnastics"	Son Yeon-jae	Olympic rhythmic gymnast	January 10, 2021
Class/Period: Skills test. Point and flex. Flexibility training. The club and hoop. Ball and ribbon. Final mission: Plan and perform a ribbon gala performance, with Señorita as background music. Location filming: Yongsan-gu
16	16	"Learning Comedy"	Lee Se-youn	Comedian	January 10, 2021
Class/Period: Skill test. Voice mimicry development. Spicy taste dance lesson. Acting practice. Ad-lib match. Makeup match. Location filming: Seogyo-dong
18	18	"Learning Pottery"	Hong Se-rim	Ceramicist, YouTuber	January 31, 2021
Class/Period: Skill test. Wheel control lesson and making a vessel. Coiling. Weight-guessing game. Final Mission: Making a birthday gift for a former singer turned PD. Special appearance: Han Se-ri, a pottery artist and also the teaching assistant. Location filming: Sindun-myeon, Icheon
19	19	"Learning Art Latte"	Lee Jong-hyeok	Barista	February 7, 2021
Class/Period: Ability assessment test. Coffee bean roasting, making Espresso brew, making iced Americano (actually a long black since water was poured in before the coffee), making brewed coffee, milk steaming, latte art. Final mission: Final orders service test: 2x Warmer Iced Americano, Latte with latte art. Location filming: Aya Coffee, Gangnam-gu
20	20	"Learning About Tarot Reading"	Jung Hee-do	Soul healer and tarot master	February 14, 2021
Class/Period: A luck for romance. Business luck. Learning tarot card reading. Tarot reading for the staff. Fortune reading for viewers. Special appearance: (G)I-dle's Miyeon and Soyeon. Remarks: Special episode for Lunar New Year.
21	21	"Learning to Alter Clothes"	Hwang Jae-keun	Fashion designer	February 21, 2021
Class/Period: Assessment Test. Alteration Basics. Denim Alteration. Hat Alteration. Final Mission: Make a stage costume based on "Lost". Remarks: Hwang Jae-keun was the original mask designer for King of Mask Singer, but already left the role by the time Yuqi competed on the show. Location filming: Sinsa-dong, Gangnam
22	22	"Learning to become a Food Show Host"	Kim Yun-hee	Mobile shopping host	February 28, 2021
Class/Period: Skills test. Pronunciation and vocalization for vocal endurance. Learning the show host proceeding, selling an item without seeing them. Learning expressions by swallowing hot and sour food quickly, and fruits with juices bursting out. Final mission: Hosting a live food show selling galbi. Remarks: Kim Yun-hee was also a former JYP Entertainment trainee, possibly trained with Wonder Girls. Location filming: Seongsu-dong
23	23	"The Making of Learn Way (part 1)"	–	–	March 7, 2021
Class/Period: Reactions to behind the scenes and previously unaired clips.: Tarot card reading for compatibilities with other members, Rabbit Dosa's reading of PD's compatibility with Yuqi, Secret reading with Soyeon.; Learntertainer with Soyeon, her reaction to Ep. 17, when Yuqi learnt to rap, Debate about Pineapples in Hawaiian Pizza.; Acting practice: The Heirs, Reply 1988; Baseball fielding lesson, as the episode only focused on pitching and batting. Perfect 2B ground fielding drill.; Cooking test with Fabri: Tomatoes and scrambled eggs, but with a frying pan instead of a wok.; Requests for Miyeon to actually feature in an episode instead of being a clickbait thumbnail.; Special appearance: Soyeon, Soojin, Miyeon and Minnie. Location filming: Cube Entertainment
24	24	"Animal Makeup Learning"	Risabae	Makeup artist, Beauty YouTuber	March 14, 2021
Class/Period: Skill test. Animal face makeover. Animal makeup practice. Final mission.
25	25	"Online Shopping Mall Learning"	Jung Jiwoo	CEO of AJ Look, Fashion influencer	March 21, 2021
Class/Period: Skills test: Match new recruit's look in 2 minutes, Logistics Team for item repairs, drafting of refund policy documents, Lunchtime: Jang Hyemi's Chinese Skills Test, MD's work: Button up shirts, Ribbon-tying test, Data entry and exposed her dislike for Windows computers, Photographing items for the website. Final Mission: Pick out a versatile outfit: One to meet with college Professor in the morning, then heading to a party after class. She must pick the items, steam and photograph the items. Special appearance: Jang Hyemi as merchandiser mentor, later revealed to have studied in Liaoning, so she is also fluent in Standard Mandarin, but cannot speak in Northeastern dialect. Ms. Park also made a special appearance as Head of Logistics. Remarks: Jung Jiwoo's intro music was Blood Sweat & Tears by BTS as she is the sister of J-Hope. It was the first time where she arrived on her bicycle. Location filming: Seongsu-dong
26	26	"Learning Gyeongsang Dialect"	Heo Kyung-hwan	Comedian, Restaurateur, Amateur linguistics YouTuber	March 28, 2021
Class/Period: Pre-test: Greeting (poorly) in Cantonese, a skill that fellow Chinese Cao Lu and Zhang Yu An knew when they were active in Korea. Skills test: Translate sentences in Gyeongsang dialect back to Standard Korean. Tonality training with sentences made by one single Hangul, as this is not a feature of Standard Korean. Yuqi's teaching's: Tonal system in Standard Chinese. Learning buzzwords.Basic expressions. Final mission: Perform an impromptu sit-com in Gyeongsang Dialect, but was later evaluated to have Gangwon Province dialect mixed in. Remarks: It was the first time where she arrived on foot as it was close to the Cube Entertainment Building, as Heo Kyunghwan is also from Cube Entertainment. Location filming: Seongsu-dong
27	27	"Learning Basketball feat. NO 3-pointers"	Ha Seung-jin	YouTuber, former NBA and KBL player	April 4, 2021
Class/Period: Skills test: Make a traditional layup, score a close-range set shot, score against a defender, dribbling test. Draft combine (pre 2019 rules) : Height, wingspan, running vertical jump by high fiving him. Dribbling and shooting training, fix Ha Seung-jin's free throws (Solution: One-handed free throw). Skills Test - Be A Player-Coach: Coach and devise plays to beat him in a 1-on-5 handicap match, first of 5 points wins. Remarks: Ha Seung-jin used the pre-2019 rules when measuring height for Draft Combine, where you can be measured with shoes on. Since 2019, you must measure with shoes off, with socks on at most. The production crew act as Yuqi's teammates, with Cash Kwon (sound technician) as a super-sub Charles Barkley/PJ Tucker hybrid. Location filming: Seocheon-dong, Yong-in
28	28	"Learning on the Spot (Part 1)"	Lee Chang-min, Jeong Jun-sik and Jo Young-hyun	Kkul-tarae seller Korean calligraphy	April 18, 2021
Class/Period: Learning how to make Kkul-tarae and calligraphy (Haeseo, Hunminjeongeum and modern style). Location filming: Insa-dong, Seoul
29	29	"Learning on the Spot (Part 2)"	–	–	April 25, 2021
Class/Period: Yuqi learnt to make wool craft of dogs and poop bread. She also called for a co-hosts for season 2, including Choi Ye-na and Mijoo. Location filming: Insa-dong, Seoul
30	30	"Reading the Comments and The Making of Learn Way (part 2)"	–	–	May 2, 2021
Class/Period: Reactions to behind the scenes and previously unaired clips, and also reacting to comments compiled by 1TheK Staff. Location filming: Cube Entertainment

=== Season 2 (2021–2022) ===
No. overall	No. in season	Title	Mentor(s)	Occupation(s)	Original release date
31	1	"Cheerleading"	Kim Yeongjung and Kim Yuna	Cheerleaders for Hanhwa Eagles	July 18, 2021
Class/Period: Skill test: Dance routine, learning the "Burning Sun" cheer (she deleted the video before filming, and had to learn on the spot), Stretching, footwork re-training, complete Burning Sun choreography, Random Play Dance, Opening Pitch after rain delayed the start, Final Test: Lead the Eagles to victory. Bonus: Meeting a little fan. Remarks: Mijoo is a legitimate fan of Hanhwa Eagles, as it is her hometown team. She had performed first pitches 4 times. Given Mijoo's background as a dancer and idol, she completed the choreography training in the fastest time of 30 minutes, even cheerleaders with dancing background took a month, or 3 months for a total rookie. The match between Hanhua Eagles and Lotte Giants was almost rained out due to a 25-minute rain delay before the start. The game ended with Eagles winning 3-2 on a fly-out to first base. Location filming: Daejeon Hanbat Baseball Stadium
32	2	"Modelling"	Han Hyun-min	Korean Model of African descent	July 25, 2021
Class/Period: Skill test: Model walk (minus extravagant squats for Music Shows, plus Cha-cha chop steps), posture fixes by standing upright onto a wall or pillar, the upright walk after standing, Old-school training: Upright walk while balancing a book on their head, catwalk rundown, catwalk show simulation with music, posing for pictorials, monitoring test cuts. Final Mission: Spring/Summer edition fashion show. Remarks: Mijoo managed to balance a book on her head while doing the upright walk, Han Hyun Min cannot do it. She already has prior knowledge for Test Cuts monitoring as the procedures are exactly the same for album jacket pictorials or commercial pictorials. Location filming: Gangnam, Seoul
33	3	"Dancesport (Ballroom Dancing, particularly Samba)"	Park Ji-woo, Kim Tae-hwan, Ko Joo-yeon	Ballroom Dancers	August 1, 2021
Class/Period: Skills Test: Freestyle dance using Hit the Road Jack by The Stampeders feat. Ray Charles, Latin Dance demonstration Latin Dance (Cha-cha, Samba, Rumba) demonstrations with Kim Tae-hwan and Ko Joo-yeon, Samba lessons, Skills test for Cash Kwon (sound technician) and practice as Mijoo's partner, Final Mission: Samba with Mr. Melody by Natalie Cole. Bonus Lesson: Ballroom/Prom etiquettes, and how to politely show you have a spouse/romantic partner, or if you need to go to the restroom. Remarks: This episode was filmed after Lovelyz went into self isolation as a staff member was tested positive for COVID-19, and was planned after the Cha-cha steps in Modelling lesson. All three speak English with Received Pronunciation as they all studied Dancesport in London, England, which is rare amongst Koreans. Park Ji-woo was also a former judge of Dancing 9. Location filming: Dance Sport Studio, Seoul
34	4	"Gym workouts"	Egg Kim	Gym owner, Personal Trainer, Navy Seal	August 8, 2021
Class/Period: Orientation: Basic info, 60-second Squat test, Balance test with Bosu ball, Tour of other apparatuses, Final test: Gym Monopoly, get around the entire board before Egg Kim to avoid penalty, but must do each exercise that each player landed. Mijoo is allowed to have to teammates from the filming crew for help. Location filming: Cheongdam dong, Seoul
35	5	"Webtoon Work Experience at Kakao Entertainment"	Various	Webtoon producer and marketing personnel	August 15, 2021
Class/Period: Interview, Induction and finding her workspace, Approval 1: Webtoon Producers, storyline comprehension, managing webtoonists, Lunch, Approval 2: IPX (Web Content Experience) Design, animating the characters as webpage/app teasers, Approval 3: Webtoon Marketing: Creating a slogan for the next promotion, Final Approval from Manager, SWOT analysis about expanding the overseas market. Bonus: Actual comments from the Webtoon Producers, detailing the harsh truth about the job, Mijoo actually listened through Cash Kwon's headphones. Remarks: This is the first time Mijoo came in on foot. Because Kakao Entertainment's main color is yellow, a golden-yellow carpet was presented instead. This also signifies a video with sponsorships. Kakao Entertainment refers people by their English nickname/English name, so Mijoo is referred by Olivia Missey, possibly based on Olivia Hussey. Mijoo was actually an E-Commerce student in high school. Location filming: Kakao Entertainment Page Company: Twosun World Building 8/F, 221, Pangyoyeok-ro, Bundang-gu, Seongnam-si, Gyeonggi-do
36	6	"Being a college student with Webtoon Major"	Choi Hae-woong; Lim Do-kyung; Park Yeon-ji, Kim Min-cho	Professor of Webtoon Department; Sophomore student Freshwomen students	2021
Class/Period: Entrance Test: Draw a storyboard of Mijoo in 10 years, Using Clip Studio Paint, Guessing game using only stick figures, creating character sheet (aka Drawing 101 for Mijoo). Final mission: Using Mijoo's storyboard from Entrance Test, the seniors will turn it into a short, static webtoon of 4 frames. Remarks: This is a continuation of last episode of sorts, after her work experience in Webtoon Department of Kakao Entertainment; Youngsan University has Korea's first Webtoon Library; Kim Min-cho is actually a fan of Mijoo. Due to her lack of drawing skills, she is better as a storyteller or scriptwriter. Location filming: WiseU, Youngsan University, Busan
37	7	"Bachelor of Engineering, Drones Major"	Kwon Tae-wook; Gong Tae-wok; Jung Seon-hwan, Song Myun-jin; Park Hyong-ryeon	Professor of Drones; Student Council President; Freshman students Professor of Drones	2021
Class/Period: Flying Skills Test, UAV 101 theory, Simulation (feat. real controller), Basic controls in a gym, bowling game with the drone hitting bottles, but can only hit once. Mijoo's team won 4-3 on tiebreaker, Experiencing flying a drone with goggles, as if she was riding in the drone. Final Mission: Filming a scenic film of the university using a drone with a camera. Location filming: WiseU, Youngsan University, Busan
38	8	"Work experience at Kakao Games and Learning Friends Shot."	Link	Planning Developer of Friends Shot	2021
Class/Period: Job Interview, Game tutorial, Practice Game, Company Tour feat Free Craft Beer and VR machine, Final Master Cup matches (single hole playoffs): Park Ji-oh (9), Park Sei (16) and Yein (23); Remarks: This is the first time that Mijoo came from taking the subway train The game was still in Beta at the time of filming The English nickname is confirmed to be consistent in all of Kakao Entertainment. Special appearance by Yein of Lovelyz Location filming: Alpha Dome Tower 14th Floor, Kakao Games Corp, 14/F, Alpha Dome Tower, .152, Pangyoyeok-ro, Bundang-gu, Seongnam-si, Gyeonggi-do
39	9	"Acting in a Joseon Dynasty Historical Drama"	Im Ho (as King Jungjong)	Actor (as Emperor)	2021
Class/Period: Ability test: An adlib skit, basics of historical drama, learning the old language of expressing basic manners, practise using modern dramas and converting into historical drama, Match the outfit to the roles of various people. Final Mission: 3-minute scene in a historical drama, Mijoo as Royal Consort Huibin Jang and various members of production crew in other roles. Remarks The restaurant is at the same place where Dae Janggeum was filmed. Basics of Historical Drama: Project your voice when giving orders as an emperor, as a peasant or a servant speaking to an emperor, look at the camera to capture your face, but do not make eye contact with the emperor Never upspeak, drop your tone lower even when asking questions, speak from the diaphragm. Eat slowly and savor the food, even when it's a beggar eating rice. Show curiosity and openness, even when things are plainly obvious. The previous point also applies to poison, sell the bitter taste of tea or poison, but don't outwardly show the pain, even when you deteriorate rapidly. Involuntary bodily functions must be repressed. List of Modern dramas converting into historical drama: The World of the Married; Types of outfits: Chosun male Aristocrat, Heo Jun (Physician/Doctor), A beggar with mild psychosis, court lady, Royal Consort Huibin Jang. In the Final Mission, Mijoo played the least historically accurate song on the recorder: My Heart Will Go On by Celine Dion. Location filming: Hondae, Seoul
40	10	"Fencing"	Kim Ji-yeon, Hong Ha-eun, Cho Jyung-hyung	Olympic Gold Medallist Sabre Fencer, Junior Champion Fencer and Head Coach and Referee of Seoul City Hall	September 19, 2021
Class/Period: Basic reach test, Agility test, Flexibility test (feat. Rock, Paper, Scissors), Ladder Agility Drill, Lunge Catch Drill, Slice Drill, Differences between Sabre, Épée and Fleuret/Foil, Basic stances and footwork in fencing, basic defense (Quarte to Parade), 5-point Right to Attack exhibition match for the instructors, practice match vs. Kim Kimin (Producer). Final Mission: Mijoo's 9-0 handicap match vs. Kim Ji-yeon. Remarks: Kim Jiyeon is the first ever female gold medallist in fencing for South Korea in 2008. Kim Ji-yeon is left-handed, a rarity in fencing. Unlike Yuqi, Mijjoo's reach is about the same as Kim Ji-yeon. Mijoo's pattern on rock paper scissors is extremely predictable: Rock, Paper, Scissors, repeated. For the final mission: Mijoo only needed to score 1 point to win, but Ji-yeon needs 10 points to win. Both received yellow cards for dissent. Failed: 10-9 win by Kim Ji-yeon. Bonus Video: Kim Ji-yeon also appeared on I'm A Survivor with Yuqi. Calling out to Yuqi, as her return to Korea is delayed by a month. Location filming: Seoul Fencing Team Training Center, Seoul Sports Complex, Songpa District, Seoul
41	11	"Cooking Steak"	Edward Kwon	Star Chef, former 7-Star Hotel Head Chef of Burj al-Arab Hotel	September 26, 2021
Class/Period: Basic cookery test: Egg roll, Knife skills with Daikon, Cooking Korean rib-eye, cooking vegetables while the steaks are resting, plating, Taste test, Very Early Birthday for Mijoo. Final Mission (set by Mijoo): Steak salad, with Mijoo in charge of grilling, and Chef Kwon prepping vegetables and dressing, then make an infomercial. Remarks: Mijoo lives alone, and is known to make Korean Cuisine. Chef's basic test is often to do with eggs. The number of pleats on a chef's hat represent the number of different ways he can cook an egg. She passed the egg roll test because she has made them before, but she tends to roll the egg sideways rather than backwards towards herself, and is bad at breaking eggs. Not all cuts of steak are suitable to have on medium-rare. Marbly (Fatty) steaks like Rib eye steak is better to have on medium because the meat is still tough on medium-rare. Edward Kwon's oil of choice: Grape seed oil Edward Kwon added truffle oil in the end. The episode was filmed on August 31, but was aired on September 26. Location filming: Oatmeal Cooking Studio, Seocho District, Seoul
42	12	"Filleting fish"	sooBinsoo (Cho Soo-bin)	Poissonnier (Fish Chef), Sushi Restaurant Owner, YouTuber	October 3, 2021
Class/Period: Blind Ability Test: Descaling a gizzard shard, and descale a pre-filleted salmon, Trimming a large red seabream, Deboing and pin-boning the fillet, make salty water with ice to float the skin, cooking the skin by pouring hot water, then blast-chill back into salty water, Portioning and plating, Taste test, Making Sushi and Spicy Fish Soup. Final Mission: Plating the sushi. Remarks: This is the first time where the teacher observe the ability test in a separate room. When a fish is presented, it needs to be dealt with right away, with the head facing the non-dominant hand, so you can de-scale against the grain. Mijoo failed the salmon descaling test since she completely removed the skin off of it. Once a fish dies off, the nerves may still fire signals, so it still moves as if it is barely alive. This is the first time Mijoo confronted with her favorite foods (sashimi, sushi, fish roe soup) when they were alive, which made her cry, and unable to do the taste tests, so a sound director from Jeju Island became the judge. She was able to carry on from the fish was partially processed and continued de-scaling. Mijoo is more fluent than Soobin in Japanese Location filming: Gangnam District, Seoul
43	13	"Tutored in English"	John Park	American-Korean, English Tutor, Musician	October 17, 2021
Class/Period: Ability Test: Self introduction, Making English sentences and dictation, Guess Who I Am Game, Learning American English slangs, Speed Quiz: Describe film and TV drama quotes while John tries to guess. Final Mission: Host and English talk show. Bonus: Learning English through song lyrics. Remarks: John Park did work as an English tutor before making his Korean debut as a singer, so it didn't count as Learntertainer episode. Slang: Slaps= Good, Adjective+AF (As F*^k). Location filming: Gangnam District, Seoul
44	14	"Learning guitar"	Sungha Jung	Self-taught fingerstyle guitarist, YouTuber	October 17, 2021
Class/Period: Teacher's performance, Ability Test: Initial interpretation of guitar playing, Parts of a guitar, Flatpicking with a guitar pick, Tuning with an electronic tuner, Guitar chords with a simplified version of Ah-Choo, Arppegio Fingerstyle guitar using Romance de Amor, Guessing songs. Final Mission: Collaborate Butter by BTS. Bonus: A clip of her playing the piano. Remarks: Due to her long nails, she was not suitable for fingerstyle guitar, and had to cut her nails before playing chords because her fingertips can't touch the strings to firm up the sounds properly. They can both play the piano. Location filming: Seocho District, Seoul
45	15	"Learning nail art"	Lee Sang-joon	Comedian, Actor, Formerly Certified Nail Artist	October 24, 2021
Class/Period: Teacher's Ability Test, Mijoo's Ability Test: Both have to trim off a finger nail, Basic Care, Gel Nails, Nail Art. Final Mission: Make a nail art. Remarks: This is the first time a teacher goes through an ability test, and lost to Mijoo. Lee Sang-joon has held his license for the same amount of time as his boss (5 years), but the license shown was a 1-year practising license. He used to be a nail artist before becoming a comedian. Cash Kwon's nails are almost non-existent, so nail art is needed to stop him from nail biting. On the bonus clip, he revealed he has fruit allergy, but didn't specify the fruit(s). Location filming: Bongcheon-dong, Gwanak District, Seoul
46	16	"Impersonations (part 1)"	Kim Bo-min	Voice Actress, YouTuber	October 31, 2021
Class/Period: Teacher's lesson on "Pick Me" dance, Teacher's Ability Test: Imitate a person from her list. She picked Ha Eunbyul from King of Ambition, Mijoo's Ability Test: Impersonate Doraemon when he takes off with the bamboo helicopter, Basics of Voice Acting: Have a base character for each age group: Infant, Elementary school kid, Teenager, 50's parent, 70's grandparent, Speed Quiz: Guess the character only by impersonations of their famous quotes Remarks: This is the first time a teacher unsuccessfully hid in the radio booth while impersonating others. This is the first time the lesson is split into parts. Location filming: Cheongdam-dong, Seoul, the cinema is a popular filming spot, including Formis_9's Halloween party and Going Seventeen's 1 Million Won game.
47	17	"Impersonations (part 2)"	Kim Bo-min	Voice Actress, YouTuber	November 7, 2021
Class/Period: Review, Character Study of People (feat. Jessi, sooBingsoo), Intensive course (feat. Kim Hee-ae in The World of The Married, Lee Jung-jae in Assassintion, Joo Hyun-jong from SNL Korea). Final Mission: An impromptu talk show hosted by Kim Bo-min, with Mijoo showing off her impersonation class. Bonus: impersonating Ahn Young-mi as Naughty Cell in Yumi's Cells; Remarks: This is the first time the lesson is split into parts. Location filming: Cheongdam-dong, Seoul, the cinema is a popular filming spot, including Formis_9's Halloween party and Going Seventeen's 1 Million Won game.
48	18	"Being A Hamburger Restaurant Staff"	Han Dasom, Lee Seung-hyun; Seo Jung-gun	Store Managers; Deputy Manager	November 14, 2021
Class/Period: Prepping the ingredients, Frying Chips and cleaning of equipment, Folding packaging boxes, Grilling patties (feat. live orders from advertiser), Final Mission: Live service and greeting customers. Bonus: She earned her black uniform, making her an honorary full-time staff, and making the special Learn Way Set for production staff. Mijoo offered to cook even after she has clocked off work. Remarks: This is the first time that there is no prior ability test. Part-timers wear orange uniform, full-timers in black, but Mijoo still earned an honorary black uniform. In the live service, there were fans of Lovelyz and even producers of Workman. Lee Seung-hyun is a fan of the show, and is younger than Mijoo by one year. Cheese sticks and cheese balls can be eaten at work so staff would avoid fainting. The opening greeting is "Hello, we're ISAAC Burger" instead of "Welcome, we're ISAAC Burger" because it's more inviting. She did get cast by Workman producers to guest star on the show on a part-time basis, the negotiations are still ongoing as of the airing of the episode on YouTube. Location filming: ISAAC Burger, Sinsa station, Seoul
49	19	"Learning Hip-hop"	Giriboy	Rapper, Producer	November 21, 2021
Class/Period: Ability test, Basics of hip-hop, Story of "148" tattoo Part 1 (feat. One Piece Comic Book), Writing lyrics, Hip-hop fashion (feat. sunglasses), Final Mission: Write and record trailer rap using No Tomorrow as a backing track. Bonus: Story of "148" tattoo Part 2 (feat. One Piece Comic Book); Remarks: Giriboy's English name is James, and he wears tinted glasses mostly as a cover for him when he peeks at the lyrics. Location filming: Seodong-gu, Seoul
50	20	"Learning Hairdressing"	Kiu, Yookyung, Sejin, Suyeon	Hair stylist, YouTuber; Hair stylist Rookie Hair stylist, former Army Hairdresser; Staff	November 28, 2021
Class/Period: Ability test with Sejin: Copy Kiu's hairstyle on a mannequin, Basics of hair cut, Basics of styling on females, Final Mission: Full styling on Ian, Kiu's friend. Remarks: This was Kiu's second appearance, after also appearing in season 1 All transactions are reversed after filming. Location filming: Gangnam District, Seoul
51	21	"Behind the Scenes (feat. Mijoo's new Agency)"	None	N/A	December 12, 2021
Class/Period: Antenna Building Tour, Flashback to final episode of season 1, When Mijoo treated the staff coffees using her personal card, the longest episode to record: Episode 1 as a cheerleader due to rain delays, Proof that Mijoo is NOT a morning person, the origin of "jab jab jab" on episode 2, unaired second ability test: Freestyle dance with Un-Break My Heart by Toni Braxton, Plyometric exercises (feat. imitating animals), reading other comments (feat. Workman's casting notes), New Bucket List for 2022, Mijoo's video letter to herself. Bonus: PD's self Antenna tour. Remarks: On the final episode of season 1, Yuqi did call Mijoo and cast the latter to "deputize" in Season 2 as Yuqi returns to promote in China, however, since Yuqi's return plans has delayed by about 3 months, her contract was extended from 12 episodes (when she was still in Woolim Entertainment). The cheerleading episode ended up lasting 12 hours of shooting due to rain delays and pre-game preparations. Park Ji-woo has returned to London, England as of the filming of the episode. Location filming: Gangnam District, Seoul
52	22	"Making Makgeolli"	Jeong Jun-ha	Comedian, Entertainer, Makgeolli sommelier, Restaurateur.	December 19, 2021
Class/Period: Teacher's blind-tasting ability test, Making Steamed Rice, making seafood scallion pancake as a food pairing, fermenting Makgeoli, Taste test, Guess Me Quiz; Remarks: Mijoo is actually a teetotaller. Due to the various wait times, the time filler is mostly a series of "50/50 Preference Games" to know each other better. Lee Mijoo currently uses Samsung Galaxy Z Flip 3 as she is one of the brand ambassadors. Location filming: COEX Convention & Exhibition Center, Elix R&D Center, Samseong-dong, Seoul
53	23	"Hip-hop dance"	Hyojin Choi	Choreographer at 1Million Dance Studio	January 2, 2022
Class/Period: Ability test: Freestyle dance with Lovelyz - Obliviate, Body Wave move and practice with Secret - Magic, Nasty (upper and lower body isolation move), Bounce and practice with GD X Taeyang - Good Boy, Joint isolation move, combo practice with Jessi - Nunu Nana, Final mission: Create choreography with CL - The Baddest Female and the final presentation. Bonus: Speak with Dance game. Remarks: Hyojin received an order of coffee for her staff, her introduction was delayed. Mijoo's stage name as a hip-hop dance in Joo-joo, which means Big Stakeholder; Hip-hop lessons form basic dance trainings for idol trainees. On the day of recording: Hyojin received her vaccination, but it's unknown if it's her second or booster shot. Mijoo's biggest issue is getting easily embarrassed while dancing, despite being the main dancer of Lovelyz. She is a toe walker because she tends to dance with her heels off the ground. The music selections for choreography creation were: Jessi - Gucci, Lee Hyo-ri - 10 Minutes, CL - The Baddest Female; Speak With Dance answers: Super Junior getting the COVID swab test, Aespa working part time serving foods, EXO bowing for New Year's Day Location filming: Yangjae-dong, Seoul
54	24	"Make up artist and salesperson"	Joeong Ji-hoon; Kim Young-eun; Joo Na-gyung; Lee Kwan-soo; Lee Sunk-yung	Team Leader of Marketing Strategy; Make-up Artist; Product Marketing Manager; Business Manager	January 2, 2022
Class/Period: Ability test: Job interview, makeup ability test, Product training on new products, giving demonstration, Sales training, Online sales/Live Informercial show training, Final mission: Working in flagship store. Remarks: The episode is sponsored, but not affiliated with Kakao Entertainment, so the carpet was still red. She naturally inherited her father's eyes and thick double-eyelids. She was a former host of My Mad Beauty (seasons 2 and 3). Special appearances by Han Jo-hee, Marketing Strategy Team Intern, Cha Ju-yeon, Marketing staff and Baek Min-ji, Online Marketing Department staff. Mijoo cannot multitask. The Lee Kwang-soo featured in this episode is much shorter compared to the comedian of the same name She is good at pressure customers to buy, a trick she learned from the hairdressing episode. She has officially secure advertising model deal with Vidavici. Location filming: Vidivici Flagship Store, Shinsaegae International Building, Gangnam District, Seoul
55	25	"Learning Mandarin Chinese (ft. the Return of Song Yuqi)"	Song Yuqi	Singer, Dancer, Member of (G)I-dle, Host of Learn Way Season 1, Native Mandarin Chinese Speaker	January 16, 2022
Class/Period: Return of Song Yuqi, Yuqi receiving guest's script for the first time, Personality tests, Ability test: Self introduction in Chinese, Corrections, The 4 tones of Mandarin Chinese, Basic conversation of ordering Northern Chinese Cuisine (feat. no pictures), Chinese fan meeting, Halftime Break: Yuqi's ability test as a tarot reader (feat. Return of Rabbit Daoshi), Final mission: Being a guest on Yuqi's Chinese talk show. Bonus: Rabbit Daoshi's prediction for Learn Way. Remarks: This also doesn't count as a Learntertainer episode, as Yuqi became a teacher only on virtue that she's a native Madarin Chinese speaker from Beijing, China. The PD has no concept of MBTI, the compatibility chart only takes account of letters in isolation, not Jungian cognitive functions (JCF's), so the chart says they are highly compatible, but when JCF's are taken into account, it's only above average. Also: Two people of the same MBTI type and JCF's aren't socially compatible, but the chart says they do. Mijoo is more fluent in Japanese than Yuqi, so she thought grammatically, there'd be a word to end the sentence, but there isn't in Chinese. The lesson on pronunciation of initials and finals were not shown. The easiest way to order food is to point at the food, then say "yí ge zhè ge" (「一个这个」, one of this). Yuqi doesn't like cilantro Learn Way 3's new host: Choi Ye-na? Location filming: Namyangju, Gyeonggi-do
56	26	"Becoming a brand ambassador"	Lee Jimyeon; Kim Juwan, Lee Sewoon	Head of Communication Team; Brand Startup Team	January 23, 2022
Class/Period: Interview, Job training and current products, On the job training by taking minutes of meetings, Final mission: Supplier and Merchanndiser meetings based on the minutes. Bonus: Banner for her winning Rookie of the Year Award in MBC Entertainment Award. Remarks: This was the first filming since she won Rookie of The Year in MBC Entertainment Award. New employees start from using a Samsung laptop without a desktop monitor. As a homebody, Mijoo failed the Seoul Landmark test, even failing to recognize her own agency She currently residers in Geumho-dong, Seoul Special appearance by Jeon Donggeun of The Satellite Brewing, who is much younger than expected (1993). Special appearances by Park Seong-dong (CEO of Baodam) and Min Jiwon (intern), both handily beat Mijoo on Lovelyz's Discography quizzes. PD hates food with mint chocolate, Mijoo loves them. Location filming: Seoul Business Agency, 400 World cup buk-ro, Sangam-dong, Mapo-gu, Seoul
57	27	"Being a Brewed coffee and Siphon coffee Barista"	TBA	Owner; Barista	February 6, 2022
Class/Period: Ability test of both Mijoo and the owner, Mijoo wins, Making drip coffee, Siphon Coffee, Making matching desserts, Final Mission: Serve Yena with Siphon coffee with matching desserts. Remarks: She filmed tvN's Sixth Sense in the same cafe. The cafe is famous for making a special menu and a specialist drip coffee cafe, often made into special coffee with whisky added in. Special guest: Choi Ye-na, who was on her way to film King of Masked Singer as a panellist, but like Mijoo, she doesn't like black coffee. The owner doesn't hold a barista certification, hence the drip coffee he made was bland. Unlike grinders used for making espresso coffee, coffee beans can't be pre-stored in the hopper of a grinder for the day, and must be refilled on a per-cup basis, so Mijoo often forgets, and she forgot to release the beans for grinding in the final mission. Perlen means "Pearl" in German. Location filming: Perlen Café, Mapo-gu, Seoul
58	28	"Volunteer for Abandoned Dogs"	Cho Eunhee; Yoon Jeongim; Lee Sewoon; Koo Sohee, Oh Jungmin, Hong Jongil; Kim Younghyun	ON Center's Team Leader of PR; Manager; Dog behavior modification trainer Animal Management Team; Team Leader of Operations Support	February 13, 2022
Class/Period: Dog Knowledge test, Communicating with big dogs, Communicating with senior dogs feat. Danbi (22 dog age or 104 human age), communicating with a dog rescued from Gonjiam Psychiatric Hospital, Cleaning the living quarters, Bathing and grooming a 20kg dog that is taking the final shower before being adopted, Walking dogs. Remarks: Mijoo owns 2 dogs herself Not all dogs have 4 toes on the back foot, some have a suspended dewclaw It's inappropriate for dogs to take a bath once a week as most have sensitive skin, so once a month is about enough. Dogs can't eat chocolate and grapes. Most dogs are more tolerant to the cold than humans, they shiver out of fear of strangers, so Mijoo's crying and worries over Pida, the dog that shivered, were unwarranted. Try not to give dog food with a front-on stance, go side-on and let them come to you, unless if you are squatting and have no room. The conversion rate between dog/cat age and human age isn't linear. Her parents does her own dogs' toenails and dewclaws, so Mijoo can't clip them in case if her lack of technique hurt them. Dog's urine kills grass due to high nitrogen concentration, so it must be diluted with water. Yellow leash and yellow ribbons are for dogs that aren't ready to be petted. Both Yena and Yuqi are also dog owners. Location filming: Namyang-ju, Gyeonggi-do
59	29	"Learning Ballet"	Luda Lee; Jung Minchan; Kim Yeojin	Ballerina, CEO of Black Toe Ballet Company; Ballerino; Ballerina	February 18, 2022
Class/Period: Ability Test: Freestyle dance to Waltz of the Flowers (Part of The Nutcracker by Pyotr Ilyich Tchaikovsky), Stretches, Basic postures, Advanced spins and jumps, Final Mission: Black Swan. Bonus: Teachers' Ability Test: Random Ballet Dance with modern songs. Remarks: Mijoo has O-shaped legs, which made her unable to stand at straight as possible, but it helps her jump up Mijoo and Luda are clockwise spinners for righthanders, while Minchan and Yeojin can spin in both directions, but Yeojin tends towards counter-clockwise. Mijoo aced the ability test by copying Luda's opening swan pose to begin her ballet solo, then transitioned into waltz dance with Cash Kwon, who doubled with using a handheld camera. Stretches are done from the toes upwards, but mainly with toes and legs. Mijoo can do the basic splits, but she can't keep her back straight, and it won't be able to be done while in the air. She also cannot do the vertical split. Her left leg is less flexible. Focusing on a spot while spinning is also commonly used in figure skating Mijoo is scared of heights. Bonus song list: BTS - Spring Day, Imagine Dragons - Warriors (first became the official theme of the 2014 League of Legends World Championship, where the final was held in Seoul.), Park Hyo-shin - Snow Flower (theme song of I'm Sorry, I Love You, this is the song used in adaptation of the Black Swan mission.) Location filming: Banpo-dong, Seoul
60	30	"Final episode, Physiognomy"	Park Sung-jun	Physiognomist	February 25, 2022
Class/Period: Basic fortune telling, Physiognomy, Compatible and incompatible work partners, Prize draw and Learn Way Quiz, Behind-The-Scenes interview, special video from all previous instructors, cakes and photobook presentation. Remarks: Mijoo's chin is pointy, so it could suggest that her later years is poor. Compatible work partners include the main PD, despite seemingly incompatible personalities, Yoo Jae-suk and Choi Ye-na, but incompatible work partners include Song Yuqi. Location filming: Gwacheon City, Gyeonggi Province

== Spin-off ==
=== Learn Star ===
Promotional poster

On January 24, 2021, it was announced that a spin-off, titled Learn Star focusing Yuqi learning from the celebrity guest. With the slogan, 'Learning from an entertainer, Learntainer'.

No. overall	No. in season	Title	Celebrity	Original release date
17	17	"Learning Soyeon"	Jeon So-yeon (Leader of (G)I-dle, Producer, rapper and songwriter)	January 24, 2021
Class/Period: Hosting a high quality talk show. Reacting to previous Learn Way episodes. Make a YUQI-ticon. Vegetable cooking show. Remarks: The cooking show is partly a counter-learning experience for Soyeon as she doesn't eat vegetables, but can cook well. Location filming: Namyangju

== Reception ==
Learn Way's viewership has exceeded 1 million since episode 19. Lee Ye-ji from the South Korean newspaper Newsen, wrote that "Learnway is loved by many viewers due to Yuqi's passion and positive attitude ... in acknowledging her mistakes ... and the chemistry between Yuqi and mentors who have appeared from various fields. Yuqi harmonized with the mentors who had appeared so far without any sense of incongruity, and quickly became friends and created chemistry." She also considered the show as something the viewers can enjoy, learn and understand about various occupational groups every time. She concluded, "Learnway is being loved by adding various things to see, know, and fun." As the show progresses, it surpassed 2 million views each time the episode was uploaded.

The show's producer Kim Ki-min said, "Yuqi lived up to [his] expectations." He commented, "Yuqi who has passed cute charm and excellent entertainment, meets mentors full of personality in various fields ... giving fun and laughter with a new look every time.
