= Montelupo Italian Market =

Restaurant in Portland, Oregon, U.S.

- Interactive map of Montelupo Italian Market

Restaurant information
- Established: 2020
- Owner: Adam Berger
- Food type: Italian
- Location: 344 Northeast 28th Avenue, Portland, Multnomah, Oregon, 97232, United States
- Coordinates: 45.5256°N 122.6371°W
- Website: montelupo.co

Montelupo Italian Market is an Italian restaurant and market in Portland, Oregon, United States. It operates on 28th Avenue in northeast Portland. Previously, a second location operated in the Westmoreland district of the Sellwood-Moreland neighborhood, before the outpost was rebranded as The Focacceria in 2024.

== Description ==
Montelupo Italian Market is a 1,500-square-foot Italian restaurant and market on 28th Avenue in the northeast Portland part of the Kerns neighborhood. The business is named after the Italian town Montelupo, where the restaurant's owner learned to make pasta. The interior has green-and-white checkered walls. Outside is a tented sidewalk patio.

Thrillist has described Montelupo as "one part Italian pantry shop, one part pasta restaurant", and said the business "navigated the perils of the [COVID-19 pandemic] with a mix of outdoor dining and a focus on to-go and delivery meals". Previously, an outpost operated on Southeast Bybee Boulevard in the Westmoreland district of the Sellwood-Moreland neighborhood.

=== Menu ===
Montelupo has served coffee, pastries, and marionberry panzanella with burrata, cucumbers, and red wine vinaigrette. Among pasta dishes are cavatelli with ricotta and lemon-braised chicken, spaghetti with shrimp and clams, and tajarin with truffle butter and Parmesan. The market stocks various food and drink items, such as imported Italian beans and grains, canned and dried tomatoes, cheese and salami, condiments, cookies, crackers, oils and vinegars, pasta salads, sauces, vegetables, and desserts. It offers bottled cocktails such as daiquiris, Manhattans, negronis, and seasonal options.

Montelupo has also offered seasonal options and other specials. For Thanksgiving, the restaurant has offered various seasonal pies, including cranberry curd, pumpkin mascarpone, and salted caramel pecan varieties. For Valentine's Day in 2021, during the COVID-19 pandemic, the business offered take-out meals with burrata and bread, arugula-and-fennel salad, cavatelli with Dungeness crab and mushrooms, dark chocolate mousse, and wine. For Mother's Day in 2021, Montelupo offered pasta meals with tagliatelle, sausage ragu bianco, roasted cauliflower and broccolini, ricotta salata, arugula salad with lemon vinaigrette, and a lemon poppyseed cake with strawberry-rose water buttercream.

== History ==
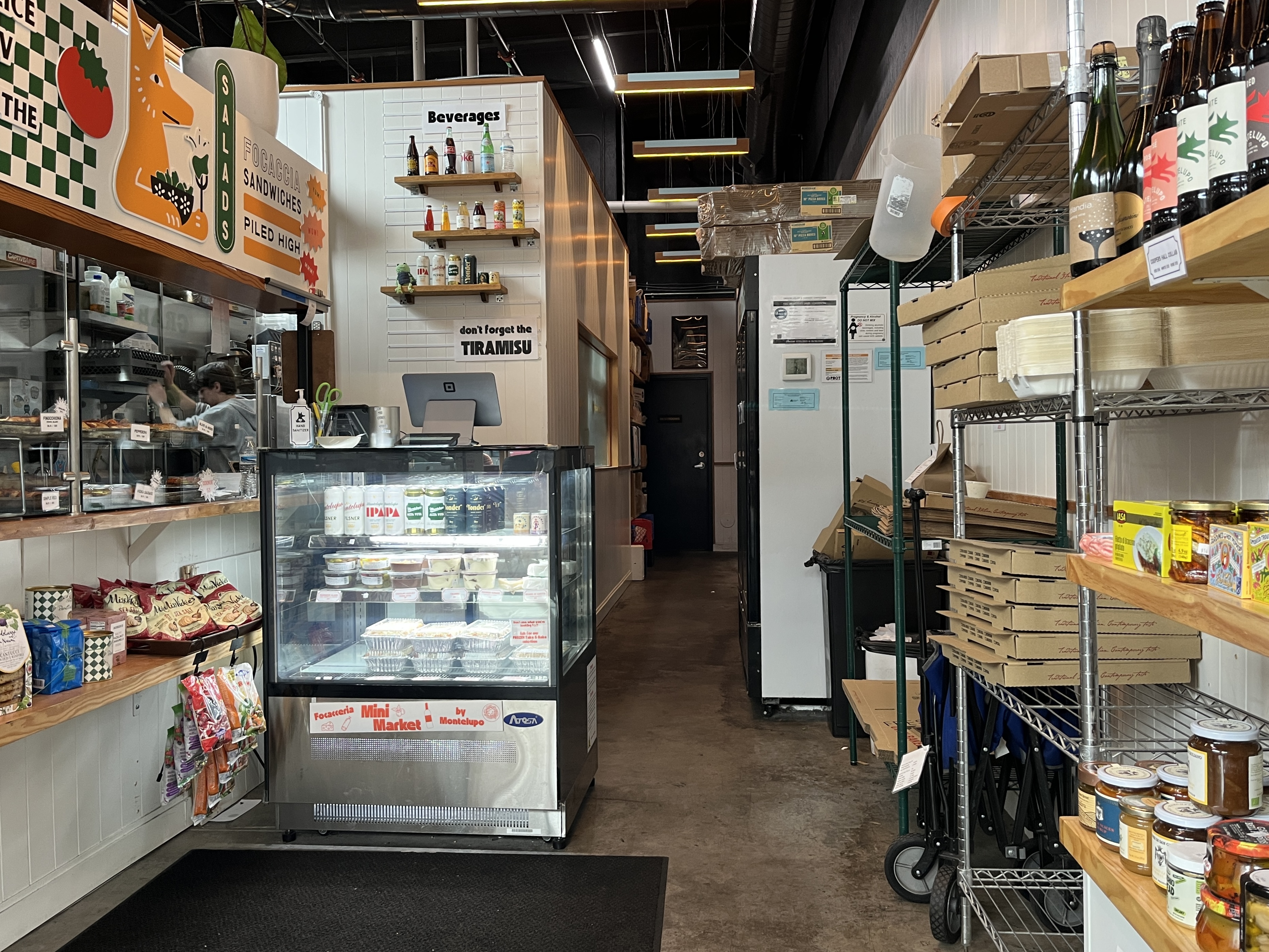
Interior of The Focacceria, 2026

Adam Berger opened the original restaurant in 2020, during the COVID-19 pandemic. The business opened for indoor dining for the first time in November 2021. The Sellwood-Moreland outpost opened in 2023, in the space that previously housed Baes Fried Chicken. In 2024, the outpost was rebranded as The Focacceria.

Monty's Red Sauce, also in the Sellwood-Moreland neighborhood, is considered a "sibling" and "spin-off" restaurant.

In 2026, Montelupo was among local restaurants, community organizations, and other businesses that joined the "We Are Rip City" campaign in support of the Moda Center renovation project.

== Reception ==
Meira Gebel of Axios Portland has described Montelupo as "buzzy".

== See also ==
- List of Italian restaurants
