= YSU =

YSU may refer to:

- Yanshan University, Qinhuangdao, Hebei, China
- Yerevan State University, Yerevan, Armenia
- Yogyakarta State University, Yogyakarta, Indonesia
- Yonsei University, Seoul, South Korea
- Youngsan University, Busan, South Korea
- Youngstown State University, Youngstown, Ohio, United States
- IATA code for Summerside Airport, Prince Edward Island, Canada
