= Propanedithiol =

Chemical name

Propanedithiol may refer to:

- 1,2-Propanedithiol
- 1,3-Propanedithiol
