= Serratto =

Restaurant in Portland, Oregon, U.S.

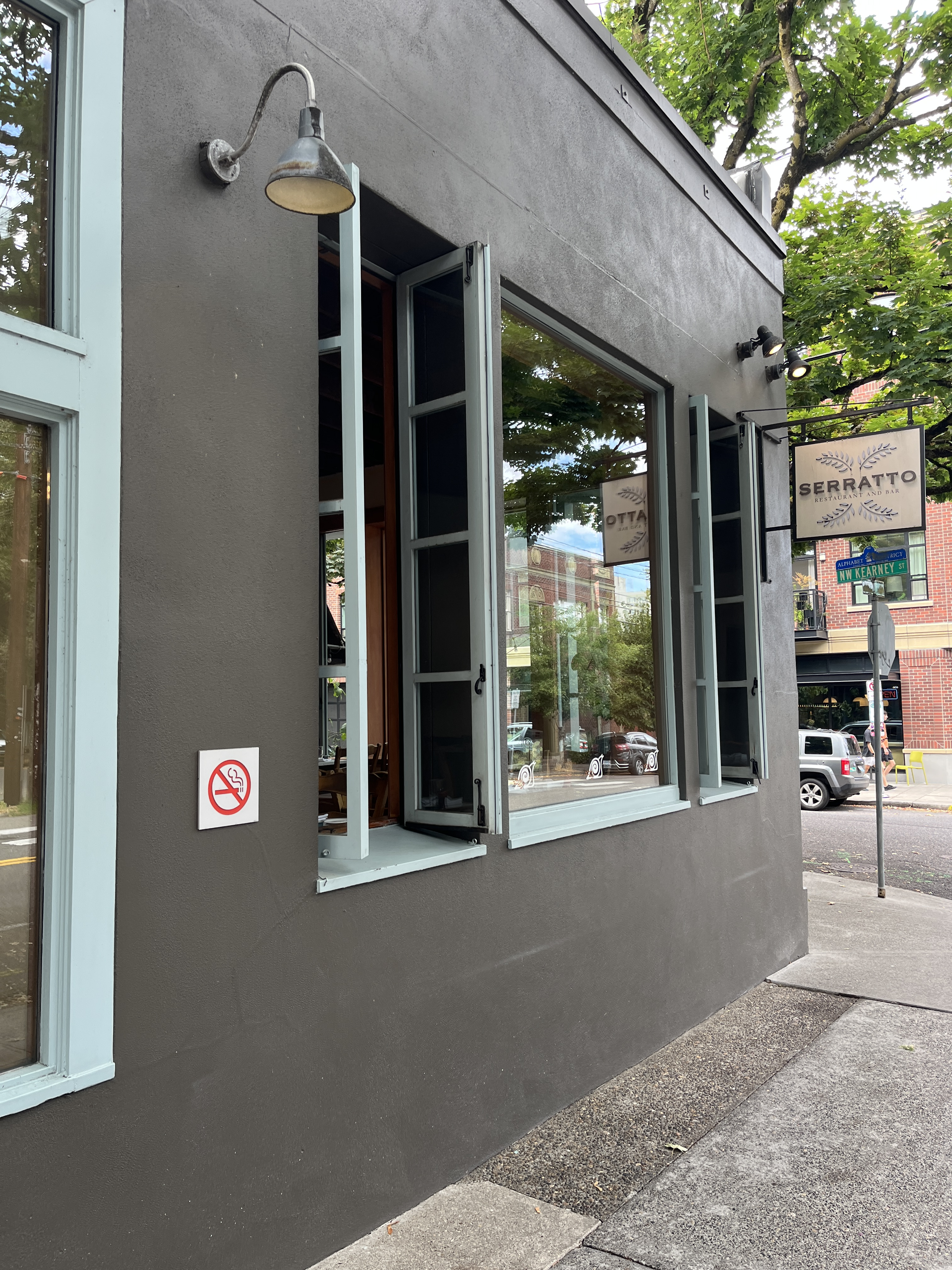
- The restaurant's exterior in 2025
- Interactive map of Serratto

Restaurant information
- Owners: Alex and Julie Bond
- Food type: Italian; Mediterranean
- Location: 2112 Northwest Kearney Street, Portland, Multnomah, Oregon, 97210, United States
- Coordinates: 45.5291°N 122.6947°W
- Website: serratto.com

Serratto is a restaurant in Portland, Oregon, United States.

== Description ==
The restaurant Serratto operates in the Nob Hill area of northwest Portland's Northwest District. It serves Italian and Mediterranean cuisine with Pacific Northwest ingredients. Portland Monthly has described the restaurant as "a spendy upscale establishment that distinguishes itself from the others by also providing a lounge-style bar". Thrillist has called the restaurant a "French/Tuscan fine-diner".

The menu has included pastas such as ravioli stuffed with butternut squash and goat cheese, lamb shank with mascarpone polenta, pork loin with shallot apple sauce, French onion soup, and a potato and spinach tart with arugula and truffle oil. Desserts include chocolate cobbler with vanilla bean gelato. For lunch, the restaurant has served pizzas, salads, and sandwiches. The happy hour menu has included a Painted Hills burger with white cheddar cheese, bacon, onions, and barbecue sauce, as well as French fries and margaritas.

== History ==
The business is owned by spouses Alex and Julie Bond. It operates in the space that previously housed the Italian restaurant Delphina's Pasta and Pizza. Tony Meyers has been the chef. Kurt Fritzler was a bartender for at least 25 years.

Serratto launched a new prix fixe menu in 2013. During the COVID-19 pandemic, the business utilized outdoor seating and retained most staff.

== Reception ==
David Sarasohn of The Oregonian gave the restaurant a 'B' rating in 2011. Eater Portland included the business in a 2017 overview of recommended restaurants in the Northwest District. The website said of Serratto in a 2024 list of eighteen "underrated" restaurants and "hidden gems" in the city: "Just a few years ago, Serratto was perhaps more appropriately rated; however, this longstanding ... restaurant has fallen off the radar of many. Nonetheless, Serratto has remained in the rotation of Nob Hill locals and is as good as ever." The website's Rebecca Roland and Brooke Jackson-Glidden also recommended the restaurant for private dining rooms in 2024.

== See also ==
- List of Italian restaurants
