= Mijoo =

South Korean singer and entertainer (born 1994)

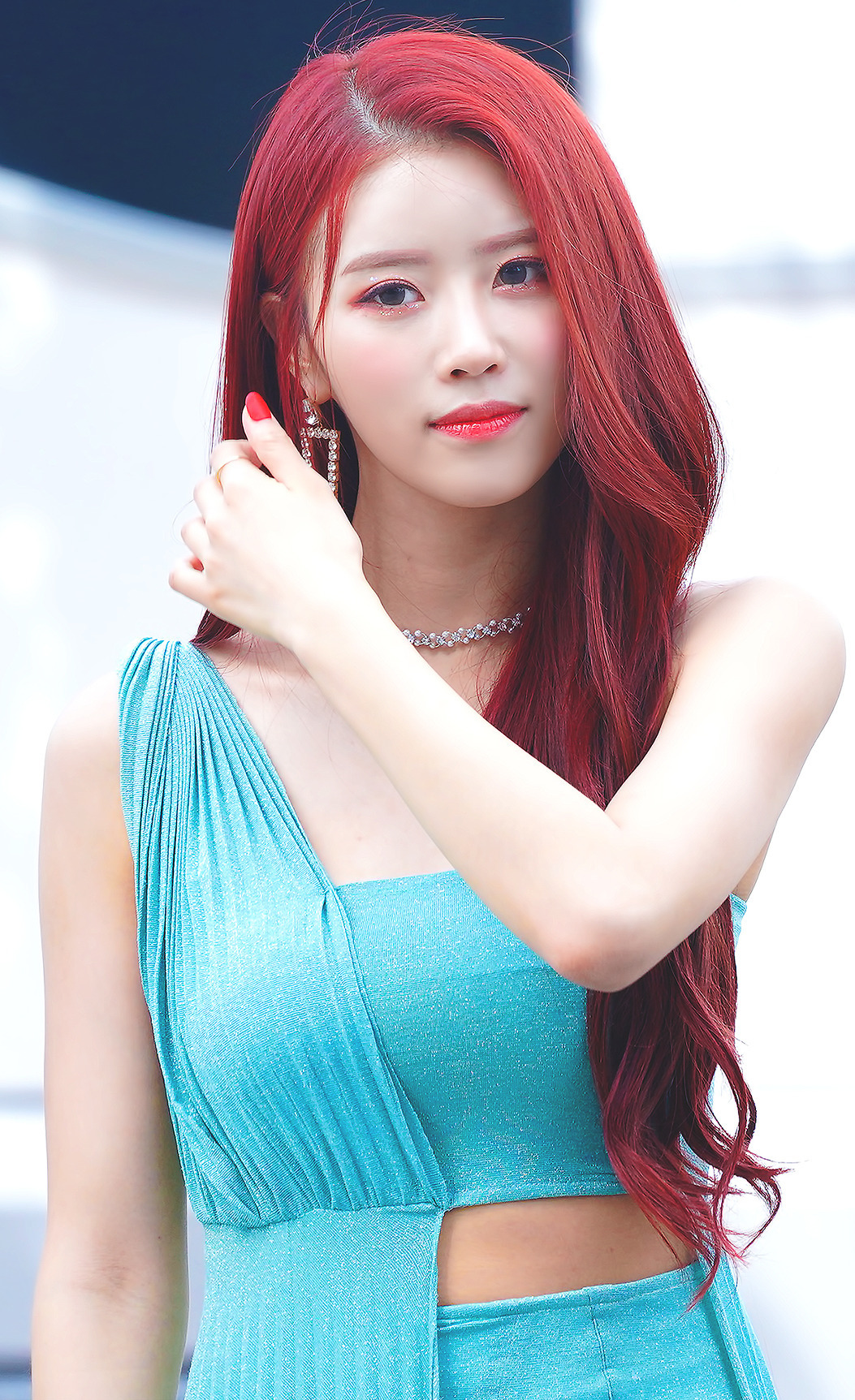
- Mijoo in May 2019
- Born: Lee Mi-joo; September 23, 1994 (age 32); Okcheon County, North Chungcheong Province, South Korea
- Occupations: Singer; entertainer
- Musical career
- Genre: K-pop
- Instrument: Vocals
- Years active: 2014–present
- Labels: Woollim; Antenna; AOMG
- Member of: Lovelyz
- Website: Official website

Korean name
- Hangul: 이승아
- RR: I Seunga
- MR: I Sŭnga

Stage name
- Hangul: 이미주
- RR: I Miju
- MR: I Miju

Lee Seung-ah (Korean: 이승아; born Lee Mi-joo on September 23, 1994), known as Mijoo (미주), is a South Korean singer and entertainer. She debuted as a member of South Korean girl group Lovelyz under Woollim Entertainment in November 2014. Apart from her group's activities, Mijoo has starred in various Korean variety shows such as, Hit The Stage (2016), Dunia: Into a New World (2018), Sixth Sense (2020–2022), Hangout with Yoo (2021) and season 2 of Learn Way (2021–2022). Mijoo made her acting debut with I'm a Job Seeker (2016).

On November 16, 2021, she left Woollim Entertainment after deciding not to renew her contract, and later joined Antenna. Mijoo made her solo debut with the single album Movie Star on May 17, 2023.

On November 24, 2025, Mijoo signed an exclusive contract with AOMG.

== Early life ==
Mijoo was born on September 23, 1994, in Okcheon County, North Chungcheong Province, South Korea. She has an older sister, two years her senior, who works as a dental hygienist.

== Career ==
=== 2014–2017: Debut with Lovelyz and career beginnings ===
Mijoo debuted with Lovelyz, which was first announced on November 5, 2014, by Woollim Entertainment. Lovelyz released a pre-release digital single, "Good Night Like Yesterday", on November 5, 2014. Their debut showcase was held on November 12 at the K-ART Hall in Olympic Park, and their debut stage was on the next day on Mnet M Countdown. The group's debut studio album Girls' Invasion was officially released on November 17, along with its lead single titled "Candy Jelly Love".

Mijoo made a cameo in The Gentlemen of Wolgyesu Tailor Shop in 2016. She participated in the dance survival show Hit the Stage. She placed 6th by the end of episode 8 and was eventually eliminated. She was also a host in Inkigayo alongside bandmate Kei and BTS members Jin and RM. Mijoo was cast in the television series I'm a Job Seeker, playing the role as Na Young-hee.

=== 2018–2021: Solo television activities, and departure from Woollim ===
Mijoo was part of the cast of Dunia: Into a New World alongside Yunho, DinDin, Sam Okyere, Kwon Hyun-bin and many more. She was also part of My Mad Beauty 2 with Lee Jin-yi, Hyoyeon and Park Na-rae. She is part of the third season of the series alongside Park Na-rae, Choi Yoo-jung and Han Hye-jin. She is also cast in the television show In-laws In Practice (2018), paired with Kwon Hyuk-soo and Shopping Cart Saviour (2019) together with Haha and more.

In 2020, Mijoo starred in the first season of tvN's Sixth Sense alongside Yoo Jae-seok, Jeon So-min, Oh Na-ra, and Jessi. She also starred in the second season of Sixth Sense alongside the aforementioned cast members and Lee Sang-yeob. Her stint in Sixth Sense 2 garnered Mijoo increased popularity, and she was nicknamed the "Entertainment Trend" following guest appearances in various major entertainment programs, such as Running Man, Knowing Bros, and 2 Days & 1 Night. From August 2021, she starred in MBC's reality-variety show Hangout with Yoo. In Episode 124 which aired in July 2022, it was confirmed that Mijoo alongside Haha, Shin Bong-sun, and Jeong Jun-ha would be officially become the fixed cast members of Hangout With Yoo.

On March 9, 2021, Mijoo revealed on Cultwo Show that she had changed her legal name to Lee Seung-ah. On November 1, 2021, Woollim Entertainment announced Mijoo would not renew her contract and left the company on November 16, 2021, following Lovelyz's indefinite hiatus. On November 17, it was announced that Mijoo signed with Antenna. On December 29, 2021, Mijoo received the Female Rookie of the Year Award at the MBC Entertainment Awards for her performance in Hangout with Yoo.

=== 2022–present: Continued television activities, solo debut ===
In February 2022, Mijoo took on her first main MC role along broadcaster Boom for Mnet's TMI Show. The program was later renamed to TMI News Show. In April 2022, Mijoo was announced as one of the cast members of JTBC's new music variety show New Festa along with You Hee-yeol, Yoon Jong-shin, Lee Sang Soon, Gummy, and Kyu-hyun. In July 2022, Mijoo teamed up with Boom once again to be the MC of JTBC's short-form video challenge program, I Want to Be A Celebrity, along with cast members Shortbox, Aiki, Winner's Lee Seung-hoon, Kim Gye-ran, Pony, and Shin Ji-yeon. Mijoo joined wavve dating program Some-ping as an MC along with Jo Se-ho, Uhm Ji-yoon, and Winner's Kang Seung-yoon and Kim Jin-woo which premiered in August 2022. In October 2022, Mijoo was announced as a host of the second season of KBS2 program Battle Trip. In November 2022, Mijoo was an MC of Coupang Play dating show Office Romance. On October 17, Mijoo released her first solo OST "Ringing" for SBS drama Cheer Up.

On January 6, 2023, it was announced that Mijoo would host the 32nd Seoul Music Awards on January 19, taking on her first role as a host of a major award show. Mijoo's debut single album Movie Star was released on May 17, with a lead single of the same name and a ballad track, "Miss You". On July 7, Mijoo joins Kim Eana, Code Kunst, and Joo Woo-jae as hosts for TVING's show Witch Hunt 2023. On August 15, Mijoo released her solo OST "My Heart Says" for tvN's television series My Lovely Liar.

On January 30, 2024, Mijoo joins Yoo Se-yoon and Kim Jong-kook in a marriage survival program called Couple Palace. On June 21, Mijoo joins the show 20th Century Hit Song as the show's new host. On July 18, Mijoo joins singers Chuu and Tsuki as guests for a web variety show called Just a Taste. On November 16–17, Mijoo reunites with her idol group Lovelyz for their 10th Anniversary solo concert. The group also performed in Macau on November 24, Taipei on December 1 and Tokyo on January 26, 2025.

On May 22, 2025, MBC's production team for What Do You Do When You Play?, announced Mijoo and Park Jin-joo's departure from the show. On July, 9, Mijoo opens her variety content Youtube channel "그냥 이미주 (Just Mijoo)". On August 3, Mijoo joins tvN's reality show Really Good People as part of the cast. On August 12, Mijoo joins Ji Seok-jin, Jeon So-min, and Lee Sang-yeob in a web entertainment show called Seoksam Play, released on the streaming platform Wavve. Mijoo joined AOMG in November 2025.

== Other ventures ==
=== Philanthropy ===
On August 12, 2022, Mijoo donated ₩30 million to help those affected by the 2022 South Korean floods through the Hope Bridge Korea Disaster Relief Association.

In January 2023, Mijoo became the first donor in the Okcheon County Love Hometown donation project in North Chungcheong Province, donating ₩5 million. On January 9, 2023, it was announced that Mijoo donated around 100,000 sanitary napkins for underprivileged female teenagers.

On March 27, 2025, Mijoo donated ₩10 million to The Hope Bridge National Disaster Relief Association to help with the recovery efforts for fire victims in Gyeongbuk, Gyeongnam, and Ulsan.

=== Endorsements ===
Mijoo was described as an "advertising blue chip" because of her success as a model for brands in various industries. In January 2022, Mijoo became the muse of Oryany, a South Korean global fashion brand for the 2022 SS season. She was chosen because "[they] expect a synergy with Lee Mi-joo, who has a casual yet sensitive fashion sense, and a brand image that presents sensuous designs." On January 17, 2022, Mijoo was announced as the ambassador for Shinsegae's premium cosmetic brand Vidivici. On January 17, 2022, Mijoo was appointed as Nonghyup Bank's ESG model due to her "positive energy and excellent sense of entertainment". Mijoo continued her relationship with Nonghyup Bank in the promotional campaign for the newly refurbished comprehensive financial platform NH All One Bank through the release of a promotional video on June 28, 2022, under the theme "There is No Set Genre." In March 2022, Mijoo was selected as the muse for Barrel Fit, an athleisure line under the sports brand Barrel. In May 2022, Mijoo was selected as the model for lifestyle brand 95PROBLEM's compression stockings line Balance Fit. On May 30, 2022, Lotte Confectionery announced the selection of Lee Mijoo as the face of a new advertising campaign for their ice cream product Seolleim due to her "bright and cheerful image" and her "great influence on Generation Z customers". In May 2022, Lee Mijoo was chosen as one of eight models for travel brand goodchoice's summer campaign along with Yoon Jong-shin, Chang Kiha, Noh Hong-chul, Jang Yoon-ju, Meenoi, Anupam Tripathi, and Pani Bottle. In June 2022, Mijoo became the advertising model for scotch whiskey brand Label 5. In November 2023, Mijoo joins Lee Yi-kyung as models for hair care brand Head Spa 7.

== Personal life ==
On April 18, 2024, Mijoo's agency, Antenna Entertainment, confirmed the reports that were circulating that she is in a romantic relationship with professional football goalkeeper Song Bum-keun. The couple eventually broke up after 9 months of dating.

== Discography ==
=== Single albums ===
List of single albums, showing selected details, and selected chart positions
Title	Details	Peak chart positions	Sales
Title	Details	KOR	Sales
Movie Star	Released: May 17, 2023; Label: Antenna; Formats: CD, digital download, streaming; Track listing: 1. Movie Star; 2. Miss You (보고싶어)	33	KOR: 3,783

=== Singles ===
List of singles, showing year released, selected chart positions, sales figures, and name of the album
Title	Year	Peak chart positions	Album
Title	Year	KOR	Album
As lead artist
"Movie Star"	2023	— (Note: "Movie Star" did not enter the Circle Digital Chart, but entered the Circle Download Chart at number 23)	Movie Star
"Miss You" (보고싶어)	2023	—	Movie Star
"Curiosity" (호기심)	2023	—	Non-album single
Collaborations
"Hello Antenna, Hello Christmas" (다음 겨울에도 여기서 만나) (with Artists of Antenna)	2021	—	2021 Christmas Carol Antenna
"Still I Love You" (with Yoo Jae-suk and Haha as Toyote)	2021	13	Still I Love You
"Lonely Night" (밤이 무서워요) (with Park Jin-joo as JuJu Secret)	2023	14	Lonely Night
"Come Back To Me" (밤이 무서워요) (with Park Jin-joo as JuJu Secret)	2023	—	Come Back To Me
"Is It Still Beautiful" (여전히 아름다운지) (with Park Jin-joo, Ailee and Haewon)	2025	124	Non-album single
Soundtrack appearances
"Loving You" (with Baby Soul and Jin)	2020	—	Do Do Sol Sol La La Sol OST Part3
"Ringing"	2022	—	Cheer Up OST Part 3
"My Heart Says"	2023	—	My Lovely Liar OST Part 3
"—" denotes a release that did not chart.

== Videography ==
=== Music videos ===
Title	Year	Director	Ref.
"Movie Star"	2023	Intae Kim	
"Curiosity"	2023	Seonghwi	

== Filmography ==
=== Television series ===
Year	Title	Role	Notes	Ref.
2016	The Gentlemen of Wolgyesu Tailor Shop	Student	Cameo	
2023	Kokdu: Season of Deity	Employee	Cameo (Episode 3)	
2023	My Dearest	Farmer	Cameo (Episode 12)	

=== Web series ===
Year	Title	Role	Ref.
2016	I'm a Job Seeker	Na Young-hee	

=== Television shows ===
Year	Title	Role	Notes	Ref.
2016	Hit the Stage	Contestant		
2016	Inkigayo	Host	with RM, Jin, and Kei	
2018	Dunia: Into a New World	Cast member		
2018	In-laws In Practice	Cast member		
2018	Battle Trip	Contestant	with Jisoo	
2018–2019	My Mad Beauty	Host	Season 2–3	
2019	Shopping Cart Savior	Cast member		
2020–present	Sixth Sense	Cast member	Season 1–3	
2021–2025	Hangout with Yoo	Cast member	Episode 103–283	
2021	Who Am I	Host		
2022–present	TMI News Show	Host		
2022–present	New Festa	Cast member		
2022–present	I Want to Be A Celebrity	Host		
2022–2023	Battle Trip	Host	Season 2	
2023–present	Weekly Idol	Host		
2023	Beauty Eureka	Host		
2023	Korean Starcation	Cast member		
2024	Couple Palace	Host		
2024–present	20th Century Hit Song	Host	Episode 220–present	
2025	Really Good People	Cast member		

=== Web shows ===
Year	Title	Role	Notes	Ref.
2017	Honbapstagram	Host	With Yein	
2020	Mijoo Pickchu	Host		
2021	Jumuniyo	Host		
2021–2022	Idol Dictation Contest	Cast Member	Season 1–2	
2021–2022	Learn Way	Host	Season 2	
2022	Some-ping	Host		
2022	Office Romance	Host		
2023	Witch Hunt 2023	Host	Season 3	
2024	Just a Taste	Guest	with Chuu and Billy Tsuki	
2025	Seoksam Play	Cast Member	with Ji Seok-jin, Jeon So-min, Lee Sang-yeop	

=== Hosting ===
Year	Event	Notes	Ref.
2023	32nd Seoul Music Awards	with Kim Il-joong and Choi Min-ho	

=== Music video appearances ===
Year	Song Title	Artist	Ref.
2014	"Last Romeo"	Infinite	

== Awards and nominations ==
Name of the award ceremony, year presented, category, nominee of the award, and the result of the nomination
Award ceremony	Year	Category	Nominee / Work	Result	Ref.
Asia Model Awards	2021	Popular Star Award	Sixth Sense	Won	
Asia Model Awards	2022	Popular Entertainment Award	Lee Mi-joo	Won	
Baeksang Arts Awards	2022	Best Female Variety Performer	Sixth Sense, Hangout with Yoo	Nominated	
Blue Dragon Series Awards	2022	Best New Female Entertainer	Learn Way 2	Nominated	
Brand Customer Loyalty Awards	2022	Entertainer Idol of the Year (Female)	Lee Mijoo	Nominated	
Brand Customer Loyalty Awards	2023	Entertainer Idol of the Year (Female)	Lee Mijoo	Nominated	
Brand of the Year Awards	2021	Entertainer Idol of the Year (Female)	Lee Mijoo	Won	
Brand of the Year Awards	2022	Entertainer Idol of the Year (Female)	Lee Mijoo	Won	
Brand of the Year Awards	2023	Entertainer Idol of the Year (Female)	Lee Mijoo	Nominated	
Brand of the Year Awards	2023	Rookie Idol (Female)	JuJu Secret	Nominated	
Brand of the Year Awards	2023	Female Soloist	Lee Mijoo	Nominated	
KBS Entertainment Awards	2022	Rookie Award in Reality Category	Battle Trip 2	Nominated	
Korea First Brand Awards	2022	Best Entertainer Idol (Female)	Lee Mijoo	Won	
MBC Entertainment Awards	2021	Rookie Award	Hangout with Yoo	Won	
MBC Entertainment Awards	2021	Best Couple Award	Mijoo (with Yoo Jae-suk and Haha); Hangout with Yoo	Won	
MBC Entertainment Awards	2022	Excellence Award, Music/Talk Category	Hangout with Yoo	Won	
MBC Entertainment Awards	2022	Best Couple Award	Mijoo (with Lee Yi-kyung); Hangout with Yoo	Nominated	
MBC Entertainment Awards	2023	Best Couple Award	Mijoo (with Joo Woo-jae); Hangout with Yoo	Nominated	
MBC Entertainment Awards	2023	Excellence Award (Female)	Lee Mijoo	Nominated	
