= Diiron propanedithiolate hexacarbonyl =

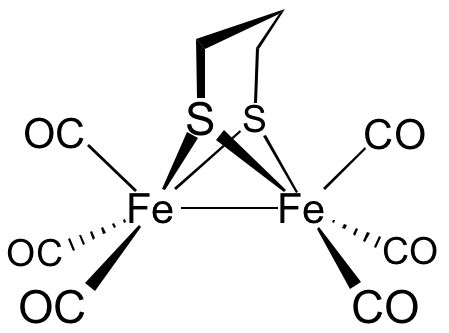

Identifiers
CAS Number	70789-83-2
3D model (JSmol)	Interactive image
PubChem CID	139250566
- InChI: InChI=1S/C3H8S2.6CO.2Fe/c4-2-1-3-5;6*1-2;;/h4-5H,1-3H2;;;;;;;;/p-2 Key: ZHHRDZYBLRXFMT-UHFFFAOYSA-L
- SMILES: O=[C][Fe]12([C]=O)([C]=O)[S]3CCC[S]1[Fe]23([C]=O)([C]=O)[C]=O

Properties
Chemical formula	C_{9}H_{6}Fe_{2}O_{6}S_{2}
Molar mass	385.83
Appearance	red solid
- Except where otherwise noted, data are given for materials in their standard state (at 25 °C [77 °F], 100 kPa). Infobox references

Diiron propanedithiolate hexacarbonyl is the organoiron complex with the formula Fe_{2}(S_{2}C_{3}H_{6})(CO)_{6}. It is a red diamagnetic solid. It adopts a symmetrical structure with six terminal CO ligands. The complex is a precursor to hydrogenase mimics.

It is prepared by the reaction of 1,3-propanedithiol with triiron dodecacarbonyl:

2 Fe_{3}(CO)_{12} + 3 C_{3}H_{6}(SH)_{2} → 3 Fe_{2}(S_{2}C_{3}H_{6})(CO)_{6} + 3 H_{2} + 6 CO

In general, the CO ligands can be substituted by cyanide, phosphines, isocyanides, N-heterocyclic carbenes, and other donor ligands. Monosubstitution can be achieved through an in situ generation of the acetonitrile complex.

Upon irradiation of Fe_{2}(S_{2}C_{3}H_{6})(CO)_{6} with ultraviolet (UV) light, CO-photolysis occurs with the transient formation of the unsaturated species followed by the formation of the solvent adduct.
