= Sixth Sense (South Korean TV program) =

South Korean television program

- Season 3 Promotional Poster
- Genre: Reality; Variety
- Starring: Yoo Jae-suk; Oh Na-ra; Jessi; Mijoo; Lee Sang-yeob; Jeon So-min
- Country of origin: South Korea
- Original language: Korean
- No. of seasons: 3
- No. of episodes: 36

Production
- Executive producer: Jung Chul-min
- Production location: South Korea
- Running time: 90 minutes

Original release
- Network: tvN
- Release: September 3, 2020 – June 17, 2022

Sixth Sense (Korean: 식스센스) is a South Korean television program that aired on tvN, from September 3 to October 29, 2020, every Thursday at 20:40 (KST), and from June 25 to September 24, 2021, every Friday at 20:40 for its second season.

On December 27, 2021, it was announced that the third season will start filming in February 2022 with planned broadcast in the first half of 2022.

The third season was originally scheduled to air on March 11, 2022, but after producer-director (PD) Jeong Chul-min and cast members Lee Sang-yeob, Mijoo and Jessi tested positive for COVID-19 on February 23, the premiere date was postponed to March 18.

== Overview ==
For Season 1, the cast members, together with a guest (known as the Sixth Man), visit three different places (or people). One of the three is entirely fabricated from scratch by the production team, and the cast members and the Sixth Man have to figure out which one is entirely fabricated, by using their "sixth senses" to analyze every detail of the three.

The correct voters will divide 6 gold persimmons among themselves as a prize, and the rest who did not vote for the correct one will pick one person among them to endure the punishment, which is to do the opening of the next episode without their eyebrows (if the Sixth Man is picked, they will post photos without eyebrows on their social media). If only one person guessed correctly, no gold persimmons would be given.

For Season 2, some changes have been made:

- The correct voters will each get 1 gold persimmon.
- The cast member(s) who have won the most episodes will get a big prize at the end of the season.
- No punishment will be given.

For Season 3, major changes have been made:

- The whole team (the cast members and the Sixth Man) will now decide which of the three choices is fake instead of voting individually. Beginning the second episode of the season, the cast members and the Sixth Man will be split into two teams.
- There is a spy for each episode, which is either a cast member or the Sixth Man. The spy's task is to mislead the other cast members and/or the Sixth Man into picking the incorrect answer, having been informed of the fabricate by the production team prior to the filming of the episode. The cast and/or Sixth Man also has to predict who is the spy among them.
- If the cast and/or Sixth Man picks the incorrect choice, the spy (and the production team) wins. The spy loses if the cast and/or Sixth Man picks the correct choice.
- Lucky Balls have replaced the gold persimmon as the reward. Throughout the season, the cast members (and the Sixth Man) are given lucky balls labeled with their names if they win. These are then placed in a raffle machine which will randomly pick a winner (who will receive a big prize) at the end of the season.
  - The team that picks the fabricate (except the spy) each gets 1 Lucky Ball. Conversely, the spy wins 1 Lucky Ball per team if both teams do not select the fabricate.
  - The team (except the spy) each gets 1 additional Lucky Ball if the spy was correctly predicted. Conversely, the spy wins 1 additional Lucky Ball if the spy was not correctly predicted provided none of the teams guessed the fabricate.

== Cast ==
=== Current cast ===
- Yoo Jae-suk
- Oh Na-ra
- Jessi
- Mijoo
- Lee Sang-yeob (since Season 2) (Note: Appeared from episode 2.)

=== On Leave cast ===
- Jeon So-min (Season 1–2; guest, Season 3) (Note: Withdrew from participating in season 3 to recover after undergoing surgery for a foot fracture and due to filming conflicts with Cleaning Up; later appeared as a guest in episodes 30, 31, and 33 but will return in the next seasons.)

== Episodes ==
=== Season 1 (2020) ===
Ep.	Broadcast date	Sixth Man	Theme	Results	Ref.
1	September 3, 2020	Lee Sang-yeob	Unique restaurant 1. Mart restaurant 2. Dak-bokkeum-tang ramyeon restaurant that operates for only 1 hour a day 3. ₩1,000,000 per meal VVIP hansik restaurant	#2 is the fabricated unique restaurant Jeon So-min and Lee Sang-yeob wins 3 gold persimmons each Jessi selected for the punishment.	
2	September 10, 2020	Hwang Kwang-hee (ZE:A)	Self-made ₩10,000,000,000 CEO; 1. Board game company CEO; 2. Pizza company CEO; 3. Fashion company CEO	#1 is the fabricated CEO; Yoo Jae-suk and Jessi wins 3 gold persimmons each Jeon So-min selected for the punishment.	
3	September 17, 2020	Kim Min-seok	Unique fried chicken restaurant 1. Chicken platter (consists of every part of the chicken); 2. Chocolate fried chicken 3. Fried chicken fried by robots	#1 is the fabricated unique fried chicken restaurant Oh Na-ra, Jeon So-min, Jessi and Mijoo wins 1 gold persimmon each Kim Min-seok selected for the punishment.	
4	September 24, 2020	Lee Sang-woo	Unique global workout 1. Persian ancient workout 2. Nepal tribe traditional training 3. Jumping workout from Switzerland	#2 is the fabricated unique global workout Yoo Jae-suk, Jessi and Mijoo wins 2 gold persimmons each Oh Na-ra selected for the punishment.	
5	October 8, 2020	Jang Dong-yoon	Unique restaurant 2; 1. Restaurant that serves Jjamppong for ₩100,000 a bowl 2. Premium Korean barbecue restaurant that provides whole pig cutting show 3. Restaurant that serves mulgalbi of 40 cm in height	#2 is the fabricated unique restaurant Jeon So-min, Jessi, Mijoo and Jang Dong-yoon wins 1 gold persimmon each Oh Na-ra selected for the punishment.	
6	October 15, 2020	Jung Yong-hwa (CNBLUE)	Unique collector 1. Car collector 2. Ramyeon package collector 3. Suiseki collector	#3 is the fabricated unique collector No gold persimmons given away (Note: Since only Jeon So-min voted for the correct answer, no gold persimmons would be given.); Jung Yong-hwa selected for the punishment.	
7	October 22, 2020	Kim Young-kwang	Unique restaurant 3 (There is a restaurant like this in the world?); 1. Restaurant that serves "whatever one says" 2. Chinese restaurant with various storytelling themes 3. Cafe that serves coffee special course meal	#1 is the fabricated unique restaurant Yoo Jae-suk, Jessi and Kim Young-kwang wins 2 gold persimmons each Jeon So-min selected for the punishment.	
8	October 29, 2020	Cha Tae-hyun	Unique restaurant 4 (Is this even a restaurant?); 1. Restaurant where one eats above the aquarium 2. Home restaurant located within a 3-second walk from the train track 3. Restaurant with a roller coaster theme	#3 is the fabricated unique restaurant Jessi and Cha Tae-hyun wins 3 gold persimmons each Remaining cast members to do the punishment (CG version).	

=== Season 2 (2021) ===
Ep.	Broadcast date	Sixth Man	Theme	Results	Ref.
9	June 25, 2021	On Joo-wan	A price like this in this world?: 1. ₩100,000,000 Baeksuk; 2. ₩320,000 Hanwoo raw cake 3. ₩160,000 hotel Bunsik set	#3 is the fabricated restaurant Jeon So-min, Jessi and Mijoo wins.	(Note: Special appearance by Hong Seok-cheon.)
10	July 2, 2021	—N/a	A restaurant like this in the middle of Seoul? Restaurants with innovative ideas 1. Restaurant that serves hydroponic vegetables planted by yourself 2. Restaurant to dine alone with French style Korean food 3. 3D mapping restaurant	#2 is the fabricated restaurant Yoo Jae-suk, Jeon So-min and Jessi wins.	
11	July 9, 2021	Kai (EXO)	Beat the 100:1 competition to get to eat!: 1. Family Korean food restaurant that has to make reservations 1 month in advance 2. Jeju specialty mulhoe restaurant that attracts a very long queue 1 hour before opening 3. Flat udon restaurant by a master, that even attracted people from foreign countries to taste it	#2 is the fabricated restaurant Yoo Jae-suk, Jeon So-min, Jessi and Mijoo wins.	(Note: Special appearance by KBS comedian Jeong Chan-min.)
12	July 16, 2021	Ha Seok-jin	Interesting fortunes that are worth knowing 1. Korea's only fortune teller doing life graphs 2. A rookie shaman who was a former music genius from a reputable university 3. Fortune teller who can look at one's fortune based on the subject's feet	#3 is the fabricated fortune teller Yoo Jae-suk, Oh Na-ra, Jeon So-min, Jessi and Lee Sang-yeob wins.	(Note: Special appearances via video by Kim Ji-seok, Kim Hyeong-min, Jang Sung-kyu, Jeon Woong (AB6IX) and Jo Se-ho.)
13	July 23, 2021	Junho (2PM)	This menu, isn't it crazy?: 1. Remake of the Great People's meal table 2. Fried hamburger 3. Coriander flatfish bingsu and salted hairtail paste pasta	#1 is the fabricated restaurant Yoo Jae-suk, Jessi, Lee Sang-yeob, and Junho wins.	(Note: Special appearances by Baek Hyun-mi and Baek Hyun-sook.)
14	July 30, 2021	Mamamoo (Solar, Moonbyul)	This is the only way to turn things around? The rich found in common areas 1. Handmade Tteok-galbi patties with sales of 2,000 a day 2. Fusion Tteok restaurant that brings craze in the social media 3. Yukjeon Gimbap with the thickness of one's forearm that has flipped Chungmu-ro	#3 is the fabricated restaurant Oh Na-ra, Jeon So-min, Jessi, Solar, Moonbyul wins.	(Note: Special appearance by Song Yong-sik (also known as Kang Doo from the band The Jadu).)
15	August 6, 2021	Heo Ung, Heo Hoon	Taste of summer that gets rid of the heat! Exotic nourishing food 1. The world's first roasted Samgye-tang; 2. The only restaurant in Seoul selling Ayu rice 3. Medicinal nourishing food course meal that changes with the season	#2 is the fabricated restaurant Jessi, Mijoo and Lee Sang-yeob wins.	(Note: Special appearances by Hwang Je-sung, Lee Jin-ho, Yang Se-chan, Hong Yoon-hwa, Hanhae, P.O (Block B), Park Na-rae, Yang Joon-hyuk, Jin Sung and Jung Ho-young.)
16	August 13, 2021	Kim Sung-cheol	There's this kind of job in this world!: 1. Tteokbokki professor 2. Horse urine collecting employee 3. Escape room difficulty controller	#3 is the fabricated job Oh Na-ra, Jessi, Mijoo and Lee Sang-yeob wins.	
17	August 20, 2021	Jee Seok-jin, Jo Se-ho	Cold to the inside! Blow the heat away with the Cold Noodles special 1. Patbing Kong-guksu; 2. Cold Jajangmyeon; 3. Naengmyeon cocktail	#2 is the fabricated restaurant Yoo Jae-suk, Oh Na-ra, Jeon So-min, Mijoo and Jee Seok-jin wins.	(Note: Jessi is absent for this episode.)
18	August 27, 2021	Chae Jong-hyeop, Nam Ji-hyun	Can't stop because it's hot! The temptation of the red flavor 1. The spiciest chill powder flower crab Dak-bokkeum-tang; 2. Slightly spicy tomahawk pork restaurant 3. Sundubu udon that counters heat with heat	#2 is the fabricated restaurant Yoo Jae-suk, Oh Na-ra, Jeon So-min, Jessi and Lee Sang-yeob wins.	(Note: Special appearance by Don Spike.)
19	September 3, 2021	Gray, Loco	Ask anything~ Strange consultants special 1. Diagnosing a life by colour alone!: 2. Healing through dance and art 3. Microexpression expert	#1 is the fabricated consultant Oh Na-ra, Jessi, Mijoo and Loco wins.	
20	September 10, 2021	Lee Sang-yi	Taste with your eyes on these crazy taste visuals special 1. Hansik dining restaurant that connects past and present 2. Chinese course meal restaurant that was placed in the Michelin Guide for 2 years in a row 3. Seasonal dessert course meal restaurant	#2 is the fabricated restaurant Yoo Jae-suk, Oh Na-ra, Jeon So-min and Jessi wins.	(Note: Special appearance by Lee Yeon-bok, Wang Byung-ho and Jeong Ji-seon.)
21	September 17, 2021	Key (Shinee)	People who read fate 1. Physiognomist who was also visited by foreign media 2. Feng Shui expert who laid the way to luck 3. Name changer who prevented divorce through name changing	#2 is the fabricated personnel Yoo Jae-suk, Oh Na-ra, Jeon So-min, Jessi, Mijoo and Key wins.	
22	September 24, 2021	Ahn Bo-hyun	The Fabricated House; 1. Dieter who lost 70 kg in 4 months 2. Cafe without any operator 3. One of the three paintings is fabricated 4. Handmade burgers with daily sales of ₩6,000,000; 5. 18-year-old daughter and 48-year-old mother	#2 and #4 are the fabricated entities No winners.	(Note: For this episode, 5 choices (all within the pension) are given, and the cast members and the Sixth Man each have to choose 2 that are fabricated. Only those who identified both fabricates would be the winner(s).)

=== Season 3 (2022) ===
Ep.	Broadcast date	Sixth Man	Theme	Results	Ref.
23	March 18, 2022 (Note: Broadcast postponed from March 11, 2022, after PD Jung Chul-min and cast members Lee Sang-yeob, Mijoo and Jessi contracted COVID-19.)	Song Eun-i, Yoon Chan-young	All about South Korea's Top 1%: 1. Female coin trader in her 20s who made ₩30,000,000,000 with ₩3,000,000; 2. Creative Australian chef who turned ants into a dish 3. VVIP matchmaking agency with membership fee of ₩330,000,000	#1 is the fabricated entity. The spy is Lee Sang-yeob, who won 2 lucky balls as the team (aside from Yoo Jae-suk, Mijoo and Yoon Chan-young) chose #3, and wrongly predicted Yoon Chan-young as the spy.	
24	March 25, 2022	Kim Hye-yoon, Nam Yoon-su	The restaurants you can't take your eyes off 1. Sashimi restaurant that serves 60 side dishes 2. Conveyor belt Korean barbecue restaurant 3. Luxurious dessert cafe with designer bag cakes for only ₩8,000	#3 is the fabricated restaurant. The spy is Jessi, who won 3 lucky balls as both teams chose #1, and wrongly predicted Yoo Jae-suk (Team Sang-yeob) and Oh Na-ra (Team Yoon-su) as the spy.	(Note: The two teams are: Team Yoon-su which consists of Nam Yoon-su, Oh Na-ra and Mijoo, and Team Sang-yeob which consists of Lee Sang-yeob, Yoo Jae-suk, Jessi and Kim Hye-yoon.)
25	April 1, 2022	Jee Seok-jin, Lee El, Song Jae-rim	Science of sleep for the insomniacs 1. Songwriter from Berklee who writes customized sleep music 2. Sleep restaurant that allows one to dine and sleep in 3. Handcrafted bed that costs ₩650,000,000, only 6 are produced per year	#2 is the fabricated entity. The spy is Jee Seok-jin, and the remaining cast and Sixth Men each win 1 lucky ball as both teams correctly predicted the spy, but only Team Lee El picked the fabricate.	(Note: The two teams are: Team Lee El which consists of Lee El, Jessi, Mijoo and Jee Seok-jin, and Team Na-ra which consists of Oh Na-ra, Yoo Jae-suk, Lee Sang-yeob and Song Jae-rim.)
26	April 8, 2022	Jo Se-ho, Choi Tae-joon	Cart before the horse: The main dish is just for show 1. Internet cafe that serves sashimi 2. Restaurant with good looking employees earning monthly sales of ₩50,000,000; 3. Korean barbecue restaurant that serves Galbi flavored gelato	#3 is the fabricated restaurant. The spy is Oh Na-ra, and only Team Tae-joon (except the spy) each win 1 lucky ball as they picked the fabricate; both teams wrongly predicted Yoo Jae-suk (Team Tae-joon) and Choi Tae-joon (Team Se-ho) as the spy.	(Note: Special appearance by On Joo-wan. To make #3 restaurant more genuine, two months before filming the episode, the production team had specially requested help from On to send an ice cream coffee truck from the said restaurant under his name to the filming site of Eve, which Lee Sang-yeob is starring in. The main purpose is to mislead the latter.) (Note: The two teams are: Team Tae-joon which consists of Choi Tae-joon, Yoo Jae-suk, Oh Na-ra and Jessi, and Team Se-ho which consists of Jo Se-ho, Mijoo and Lee Sang-yeob.)
27	April 15, 2022	Lee Yi-kyung, Kwon Yu-ri	Kimchi Rebellion: Korea's national dish 1. Restaurant that serves abalone kimchi Bossam sets that is limited to 10 per day 2. Korean barbecue restaurant that serves over 10 kimchi varieties from around Korea; 3. Pizza chain serving pork belly and kimchi jjim pizza	#3 is the fabricated restaurant. The spy is Lee Yi-kyung, and the remaining cast and Kwon Yu-ri each win 1 lucky ball as both teams picked the fabricate; both teams wrongly predicted Mijoo (Team Yi-kyung) and Yoo Jae-suk (Team Jae-suk) as the spy.	(Note: The two teams are: Team Yi-kyung which consists of Lee Yi-kyung, Jessi and Lee Sang-yeob, and Team Jae-suk which consists of Yoo Jae-suk, Oh Na-ra, Mijoo and Kwon Yu-ri.)
28	April 22, 2022	Kwon Il-yong, On Joo-wan	Exotic investments that the rich are into nowadays 1. Prehistoric fish business that earns up to ₩100,000,000 monthly 2. Mushroom planting business that creates a profit of ₩200,000,000 with just 1 type of mushroom sold 3. Art toys collection that is valued at ₩400,000,000	#2 is the fabricated entity. The spy is Mijoo, and the remaining cast and Sixth Men each win 1 lucky ball as the team has picked the fabricate; the team has wrongly predicted Kwon Il-yong as the spy.	(Note: For this episode, the entire cast and Sixth Men are of one team.)
29	April 29, 2022	Kim Jong-min, Lee Eun-ji	Successful marketing! Amazing restaurants with crazy tasty ideas 1. Retro barbeque restaurant that MZers rave about with a monthly revenue of ₩100,000,000; 2. Global build your own Ramyeon restaurant with a monthly revenue of ₩70,000,000; 3. Cafe that sells scooped cakes according to weight with a monthly revenue of ₩100,000,000	#2 is the fabricated entity. The spy is Kim Jong-min, and only Team Sang-yeob each win 1 lucky ball as they picked the fabricate; Team Sang-yeob correctly predicted the spy, while Team Jong-min wrongly predicted Lee Eun-ji as the spy.	(Note: The two teams are: Team Sang-yeob which consists of Lee Sang-yeob, Yoo Jae-suk, Jessi and Lee Eun-ji, and Team Jong-min which consists of Kim Jong-min, Oh Na-ra and Mijoo.)
30	May 6, 2022	Jeon So-min, Lee Joo-myung	Is this true?! Unbelievable stories 1. Musician who plays the Theremin; 2. Chain restaurant serving mint chocolate Tteokbokki that doubled the number of stores 3. French Bulldog who inherited of billions of won from its owner	#3 is the fabricated entity. The spy is Jessi, and only Team Jae-suk (except the spy) each win 1 lucky ball as they picked the fabricate; both teams wrongly predicted Jeon So-min (Team Sang-yeob) and Yoo Jae-suk (Team Jae-suk) as the spy.	(Note: The two teams are: Team Sang-yeob which consists of Lee Sang-yeob, Mijoo and Lee Joo-myung, and Team Jae-suk which consists of Yoo Jae-suk, Oh Na-ra, Jessi and Jeon So-min.)
31	May 13, 2022	Jeon So-min, Aiki, no:ze	Why are you here?! Restaurants with unusual combinations 1. Korean-style Italian restaurant that serves boiled-down Doenjang and Jeonju bibim pasta 2. Restaurant that serves Gamja-tang with Tonkatsu; 3. Korean barbecue restaurant that serves Samgyeopsal jjajangmyeon, with monthly sales of ₩80,000,000	#2 is the fabricated restaurant. The spy is Jeon So-min, and only Team no:ze each win 1 lucky ball as they picked the fabricate; both teams correctly predicted the spy.	(Note: The two teams are: Team Aiki which consists of Aiki, Yoo Jae-suk, Lee Sang-yeob and Jeon So-min, and Team no:ze which consists of no:ze, Oh Na-ra, Jessi and Mijoo.)
32	May 20, 2022	Nucksal, Code Kunst	It exists or it doesn't 1. Bicycle department store that occupies the 1st and 3rd stories 2. Restaurant that has nothing, not even a counter 3. Barbecue restaurant that sells meat aged for 480 hours with mucor	#1 is the fabricated entity. The spy is Code Kunst, who won 3 lucky balls as both teams chose #2, and both teams wrongly predicted Nucksal as the spy.	(Note: The two teams are: Team Nucksal which consists of Nucksal, Mijoo and Lee Sang-yeob, and Team Code Kunst which consists of Code Kunst, Yoo Jae-suk, Oh Na-ra and Jessi.)
33	May 27, 2022	Jeon So-min, Noh Sa-yeon, Kang Daniel	The Mun Ikjeom of restaurants! The first ever restaurants 1. The first local Portuguese restaurant in Korea serving mediterranean cuisine 2. The first sushi restaurant that applied for a patent for its 50 cm sushi, with yearly sales of ₩600,000,000; 3. The only barbeque restaurant in Seoul that serves rare meat cuts such as pig blood vessels and nipple meat	#1 is the fabricated restaurant. The spy is Lee Sang-yeob, and only Team Na-ra each win 2 lucky balls as they picked the fabricate and correctly predicted the spy; Team Sa-yeon wrongly predicted Noh Sa-yeon as the spy.	(Note: The two teams are: Team Na-ra which consists of Oh Na-ra, Jessi, Mijoo and Jeon So-min, and Team Sa-yeon which consists of Noh Sa-yeon, Yoo Jae-suk, Lee Sang-yeob and Kang Daniel.) (Note: Special appearance by Christian Burgos.)
34	June 3, 2022	Kim Ji-seok	People living their second lives 1. Dance instructor who was a school principal 2. Jokbal restaurant boss who was an announcer 3. Shaman who was a popular trot television program PD	#2 is the fabricated entity. The spy is Mijoo, and only Team Sang-yeob each win 1 lucky ball as they picked the fabricate; both teams wrongly predicted Jessi (Team Sang-yeob) and Yoo Jae-suk (Team Ji-seok) as the spy.	(Note: The two teams are: Team Sang-yeob which consists of Lee Sang-yeob, Yoo Jae-suk and Jessi, and Team Ji-seok which consists of Kim Ji-seok, Oh Na-ra and Mijoo.) (Note: Special appearances by Jeong Gwi-hwa and Lee Hye-sung.)
35	June 10, 2022	Kim Ji-min, Kim Min-kyu	Unique cohabitations that unexpectedly go well together 1. Self-revision rooms in a coin karaoke noraebang 2. Noodle restaurant in a fruit store 3. Pet cafe with fine-dining course meals	#2 is the fabricated entity. The spy is Yoo Jae-suk, and only Team Min-kyu each win 1 lucky ball as they picked the fabricate; both teams wrongly predicted Jessi (Team Jae-suk) and Kim Ji-min (Team Min-kyu) as the spy.	(Note: The two teams are: Team Jae-suk which consists of Yoo Jae-suk, Mijoo and Kim Ji-min, and Team Min-kyu which consists of Kim Min-kyu, Oh Na-ra, Jessi and Lee Sang-yeob.) (Note: Special voice appearance by Hyojung (Oh My Girl).)
36	June 17, 2022	Park Jin-joo, Arin (Oh My Girl)	Let's get oil in the era of high oil prices, through taste 1. Restaurant that serves pork Confit matured for 12 hours, an hour and a half wait is a must 2. Restaurant that serves bread crumbs tempura skewers Omakase, developed for over a year 3. Sesame oil based brunch restaurant that sells sesame oil at ₩100,000 per bottle	#3 is the fake restaurant. The spy is Oh Na-ra, and only Team Arin each win 1 lucky ball as they picked the fabricate; both teams wrongly predicted Lee Sang-yeob (Team Jin-joo) and Park Jin-joo (Team Arin) as the spy.	(Note: The two teams are: Team Jin-joo which consists of Park Jin-joo, Yoo Jae-suk and Oh Na-ra, and Team Arin which consists of Arin, Jessi, Mijoo and Lee Sang-yeob.)

== Lucky Ball Tally ==
Season 3 (2022)
	Episode	23	24	25	26	27	28	29	30	31	32	33	34	35	36	Total
Cast	Yoo Jae-suk			1	1	1	1	2	1	1			1			9
Cast	Oh Na-ra			1		1	1		1	2		2		1		9
Cast	Jessi		3	2	1	1	1	2		2		2	1	1	1	17
Cast	Mijoo			2		1				2		2			1	7 (Note: Mijoo gave one of her Lucky Balls to Park Jin-joo.)
Cast	Lee Sang-yeob	2		1		1	1	2		1			1	1	1	11
Guest-Member	Lee El			2												2
Guest-Member	Song Jae-rim			1												1
Guest-Member	Choi Tae-joon				1											1
Guest-Member	Kwon Yu-ri					1										1
Guest-Member	Kwon Il-yong						1									1
Guest-Member	On Joo-wan						1									1
Guest-Member	Lee Eun-ji							2								2
Guest-Member	Jeon So-min								1			2				3
Guest-Member	no:ze									2						2
Guest-Member	Aiki									1						1
Guest-Member	Code Kunst										3					3
Guest-Member	Kim Min-kyu													1		1
Guest-Member	Arin														1	1
Guest-Member	Park Jin-joo														1	1

Lucky Draw
Rank of Prize	Prize	Winner
6th	Shake Board	Jessi
5th	Cordless Vacuum Cleaner	Jessi
4th	₩1,000,000 Subway Gift Card	Arin
3rd	Induction Stove	Yoo Jae-suk
2nd	100 Bottles of Sesame Oil	Code Kunst
1st	Massage Chair	Lee Sang-yeob

== Viewership ==
Sixth Sense (Seasons 1-3) : South Korea viewers per episode (thousands)

Season	Episode number														Average
Season	1	2	3	4	5	6	7	8	9	10	11	12	13	14	Average
1	865	709	777	614	895	681	874	922	–						792
2	817	730	696	765	972	956	580	1047	993	992	798	856	871	875	853
3	941	859	826	797	753	770	709	791	664	640	634	676	605	690	740

Source: Audience measurement performed nationwide by Nielsen Korea.
Season 1 (2020)
- In the ratings below, the highest rating for the show is in red, and the lowest rating for the show is in blue each year.

Average TV viewership ratings
Ep.	Original broadcast date	Nielsen Korea	
Ep.	Original broadcast date	Nationwide	Seoul
1	September 3, 2020	3.219% (1st)	3.768% (1st)
2	September 10, 2020	2.876% (2nd)	3.481% (2nd)
3	September 17, 2020	2.798% (2nd)	3.356% (2nd)
4	September 24, 2020	2.341% (1st)	2.764% (1st)
5	October 8, 2020	3.269% (2nd)	3.810% (2nd)
6	October 15, 2020	2.747% (2nd)	2.922% (2nd)
7	October 22, 2020	3.239% (2nd)	4.089% (2nd)
8	October 29, 2020	3.339% (2nd)	4.327% (2nd)

Season 2 (2021)
- In the ratings below, the highest rating for the show is in red, and the lowest rating for the show is in blue each year.

Average TV viewership ratings
Ep.	Original broadcast date	Nielsen Korea	
Ep.	Original broadcast date	Nationwide	Seoul
9	June 25, 2021	2.736%	3.011%
10	July 2, 2021	2.767%	3.509%
11	July 9, 2021	2.532%	2.735%
12	July 16, 2021	3.035%	3.184%
13	July 23, 2021	3.272%	3.732%
14	July 30, 2021	3.435%	3.741%
15	August 6, 2021	2.074%	1.937%
16	August 13, 2021	3.381%	3.741%
17	August 20, 2021	3.314%	3.799%
18	August 27, 2021	3.142%	3.484%
19	September 3, 2021	2.724%	3.018%
20	September 10, 2021	2.930%	3.230%
21	September 17, 2021	3.265%	3.495%
22	September 24, 2021	2.827%	3.013%

Season 3 (2022)
- In the ratings below, the highest rating for the show is in red, and the lowest rating for the show is in blue each year.

Average TV viewership ratings
Ep.	Original broadcast date	Nielsen Korea	
Ep.	Original broadcast date	Nationwide	Seoul
23	March 18, 2022	3.512% (1st)	4.089% (1st)
24	March 25, 2022	3.299% (1st)	3.396% (1st)
25	April 1, 2022	3.033% (1st)	3.129% (1st)
26	April 8, 2022	2.785% (1st)	3.140% (1st)
27	April 15, 2022	2.732% (1st)	3.022% (1st)
28	April 22, 2022	2.525% (1st)	2.864% (1st)
29	April 29, 2022	2.682% (1st)	2.739% (1st)
30	May 6, 2022	2.790% (1st)	2.969% (1st)
31	May 13, 2022	2.527% (1st)	2.573% (1st)
32	May 20, 2022	2.475% (1st)	2.478% (1st)
33	May 27, 2022	2.636% (1st)	2.467% (1st)
34	June 3, 2022	2.907% (1st)	3.018% (1st)
35	June 10, 2022	2.161% (1st)	2.254% (1st)
36	June 17, 2022	2.719% (1st)	2.654% (1st)

== Awards and nominations ==
Year	Award	Category	Recipient	Result	Ref.
2021	57th Baeksang Arts Awards	Grand Prize (Daesang) for TV	Yoo Jae-suk	Won	
2021	57th Baeksang Arts Awards	Best Variety Performer – Male	Yoo Jae-suk	Nominated	

== Controversy ==
=== Sexual assault ===
On February 25, 2026, it was revealed that PD Jung Chul-min was indicted on charges for sexual assaulting an unnamed junior PD during the production of Sixth Sense City Tour 2. The victim explained that the incident happened in mid 2025, where she was sexually assaulted by PD Chul-min multiple times, despite refusing, but later got dismissed by him from the staff team on August 20, after PD Chul-min was aware that the incident was being reported by her. In December 2025, she tried to report the incident to the police, but the report was rejected by the police. She later immediately appealed her rejected report and contacted the agency. During the airing of Sixth Sense City Tour 2, CJ ENM was aware of the incident situation from the victim and proceeded to give disciplinary action to PD Jung Chul-min. On February 25, 2026, the victim's appeal was approved by the court, who later indicted PD Jung Chul-min with the sexual assault charge and will hold a court trial about the incident.
