= Tiapamil =

Chemical compound

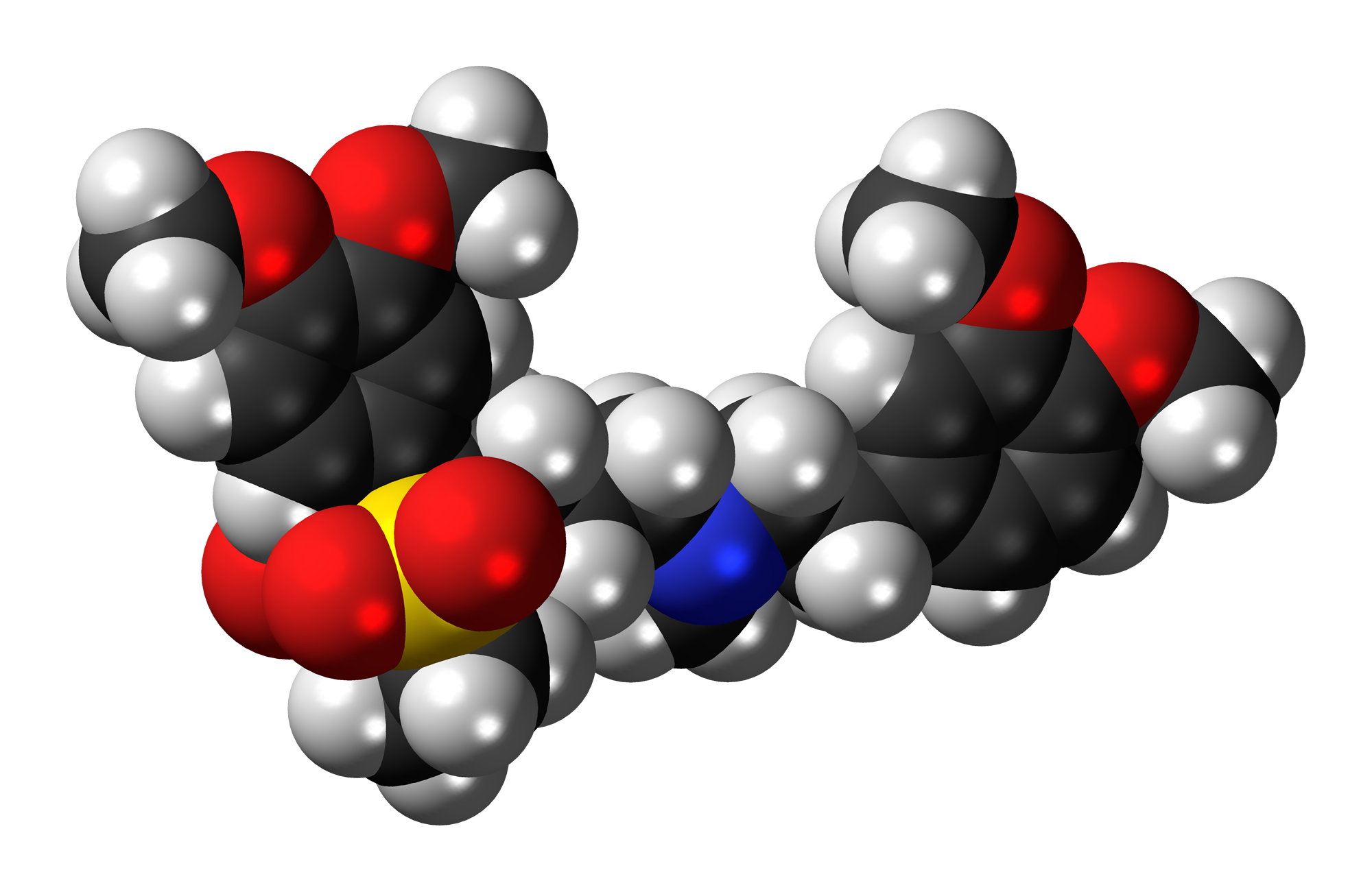

Clinical data
- Other names: Dimeditiapramine; Ro 11-1781

Identifiers
- IUPAC name: 2-(3,4-Dimethoxyphenyl)-2-(3-{[2-(3,4-dimethoxyphenyl)ethyl]methylamino}propyl)-1λ^{6},3λ^{6}-dithiane-1,1,3,3-tetrone
- CAS Number: 57010-31-8
- PubChem CID: 42107
- ChemSpider: 38399
- UNII: 0ONY823T4J
- CompTox Dashboard (EPA): DTXSID10205620
- ECHA InfoCard: 100.054.992

Chemical and physical data
- Formula: C_{26}H_{37}NO_{8}S_{2}
- Molar mass: 555.70 g·mol^{−1}
- 3D model (JSmol): Interactive image
- SMILES: CN(CCCC1(S(=O)(=O)CCCS1(=O)=O)C2=CC(=C(C=C2)OC)OC)CCC3=CC(=C(C=C3)OC)OC

Tiapamil (INN; also known as dimeditiapramine) is a calcium antagonist or calcium channel blocker. It is an experimental drug that has never been marketed.

Tiapamil has been described as an antianginal agent. It exhibits properties of anti-arrhythmic medications. These are medications that are used to treat unusually fast or irregular heartbeats. Examples of arrhytmthic conditions include atrial fibrillation, atrial flutter, and super-ventricular tachycardia. Upon research, the drug shows promising effects on treatment of these condition. Research seeks to create a treatment with tiapamil in order to mitigate the side effects of the more commonly prescribed calcium antagonist and anti-hypertensive verapamil. The two drugs have similar properties; however, tiapamil appears to treat arrhythmic conditions without many of the hypotensive, negative inotropic, and negative chronotropic side effects. Tiapamil is a calcium channel blocker that acts on the slow calcium channels. It can treat ventricular arrhythmias to a higher degree than traditional calcium antagonists.

== See also ==
- Verapamil
