= Truffle butter =

Flavored butter

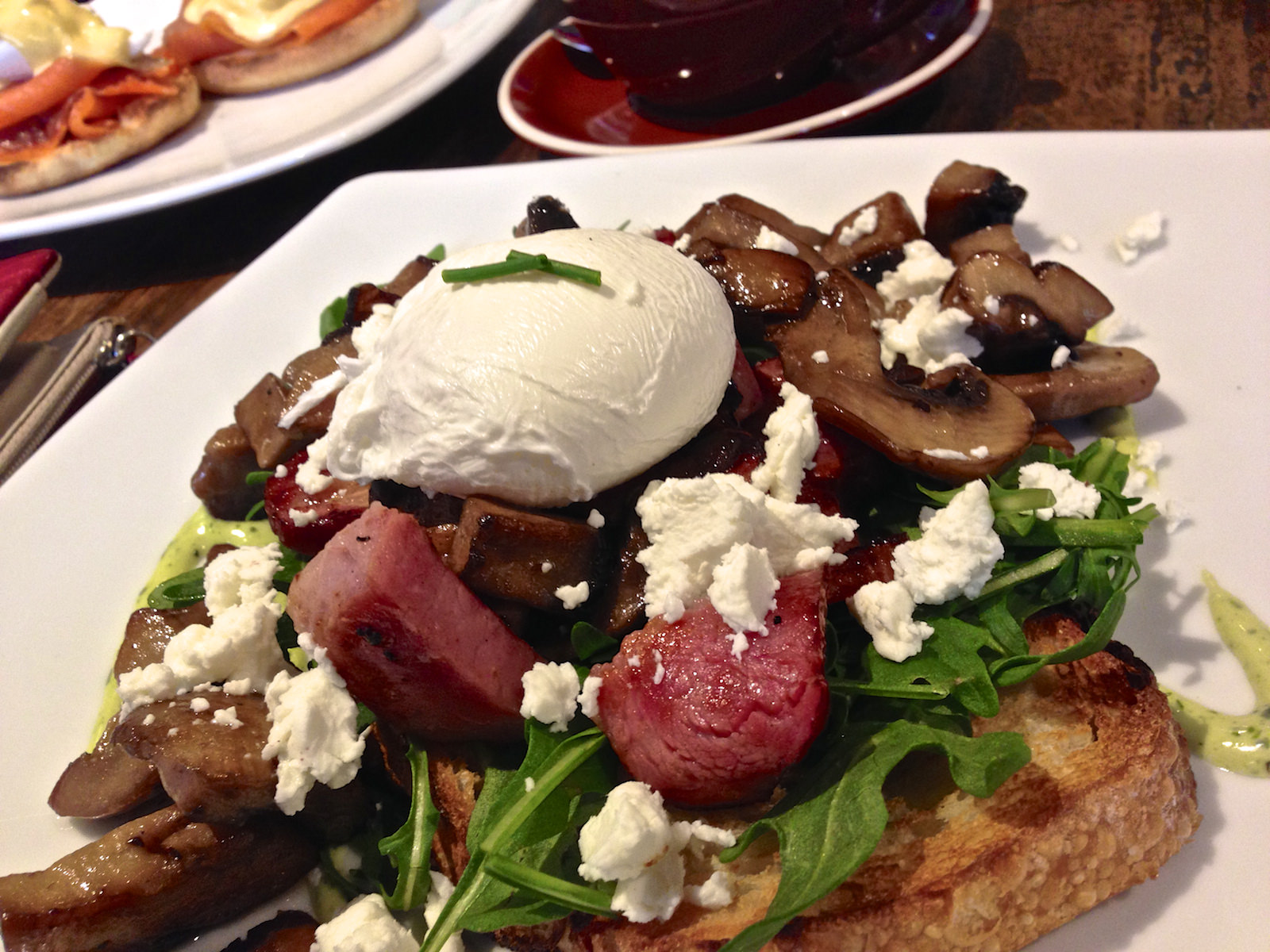
Sautéed field mushrooms topped with truffle butter

Truffle butter is a compound butter made with butter combined with other ingredients, including truffles or synthetic truffle flavorings such as 2,4-dithiapentane.
