= 2,4-Dithiapentane =

- Skeletal formula of 2,4-dithiapentane

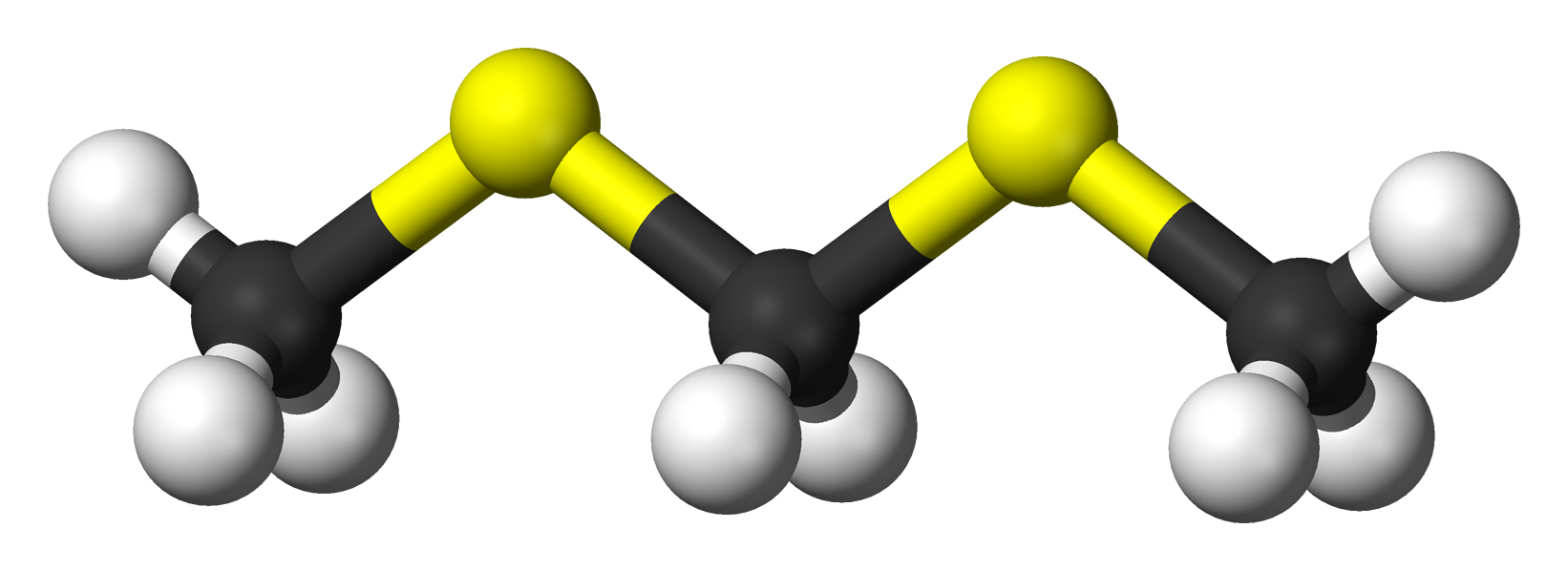
- Ball-and-stick model

Names
- Preferred IUPAC name Bis(methylsulfanyl)methane
- Other names Bis(methylthio)methane; Bis(methylmercapto)methane; 2,4-Dithiapentane

Identifiers
CAS Number	1618-26-4
3D model (JSmol)	Interactive image
Beilstein Reference	1731143
ChEBI	CHEBI:167064
ChemSpider	14639
ECHA InfoCard	100.015.071
EC Number	216-577-9
PubChem CID	15380
UNII	128SGX814T
CompTox Dashboard (EPA)	DTXSID0061822
- InChI: InChI=1S/C3H8S2/c1-4-3-5-2/h3H2,1-2H3 Key: LOCDPORVFVOGCR-UHFFFAOYSA-N; InChI=1/C3H8S2/c1-4-3-5-2/h3H2,1-2H3 Key: LOCDPORVFVOGCR-UHFFFAOYAH
- SMILES: CSCSC

Properties
Chemical formula	C_{3}H_{8}S_{2}
Molar mass	108.22 g·mol^{−1}
Appearance	Liquid
Density	1.059 g/cm^{3}, liquid
Melting point	−20.5 °C (−4.9 °F; 252.7 K)
Boiling point	147 °C (297 °F; 420 K)
Solubility in water	Immiscible
Refractive index (n_{D})	1.53
Viscosity	0.00113 Pa s

Hazards
- GHS labelling
Pictograms	(GHS02: Flammable) (GHS07: Exclamation mark)
Signal word	Warning
Hazard statements	H226, H315, H319, H335
Precautionary statements	P210, P233, P240, P241, P242, P243, P261, P264, P271, P280, P302+P352, P303+P361+P353, P304+P340, P305+P351+P338, P312, P321, P332+P313, P337+P313, P362, P370+P378, P403+P233, P403+P235, P405, P501
NFPA 704 (fire diamond)	1 2
Flash point	43.89 °C (111.00 °F; 317.04 K)
Safety data sheet (SDS)	External MSDS
- Except where otherwise noted, data are given for materials in their standard state (at 25 °C [77 °F], 100 kPa). verify (what is ?) Infobox references

2,4-Dithiapentane is an organosulfur compound, and is the simplest alkyl dithioether. It is a colorless liquid with a strong odor, reminiscent of freshly prepared mustard in the pure form.

2,4-Dithiapentane is the dimethyl dithioacetal of formaldehyde. Its synthesis was first reported in 1941. It is industrially prepared by the acid-catalyzed condensation of methyl mercaptan, the main aromatic compound in both halitosis and foot odor and a secondary compound in flatulence, with formaldehyde.

2 CH_{3}SH + H_{2}C=O → CH_{3}SCH_{2}SCH_{3} + H_{2}O

2,4-Dithiapentane is found as an aromatic component in some truffle varieties. A synthetic version is used as the primary aromatic additive in commercial "truffle" products, such as truffle oil, truffle butter, truffle salt and truffle pastes, many of which contain no truffle content at all, and have elevated levels of 2,4-dithiapentane compared to levels in natural truffle products. It has also been found to occur naturally in rotting wood of some species in the genus Lecythis.
