= 1,3-Propanedithiol =

Chemical compound

- 1,3-Propanedithiol

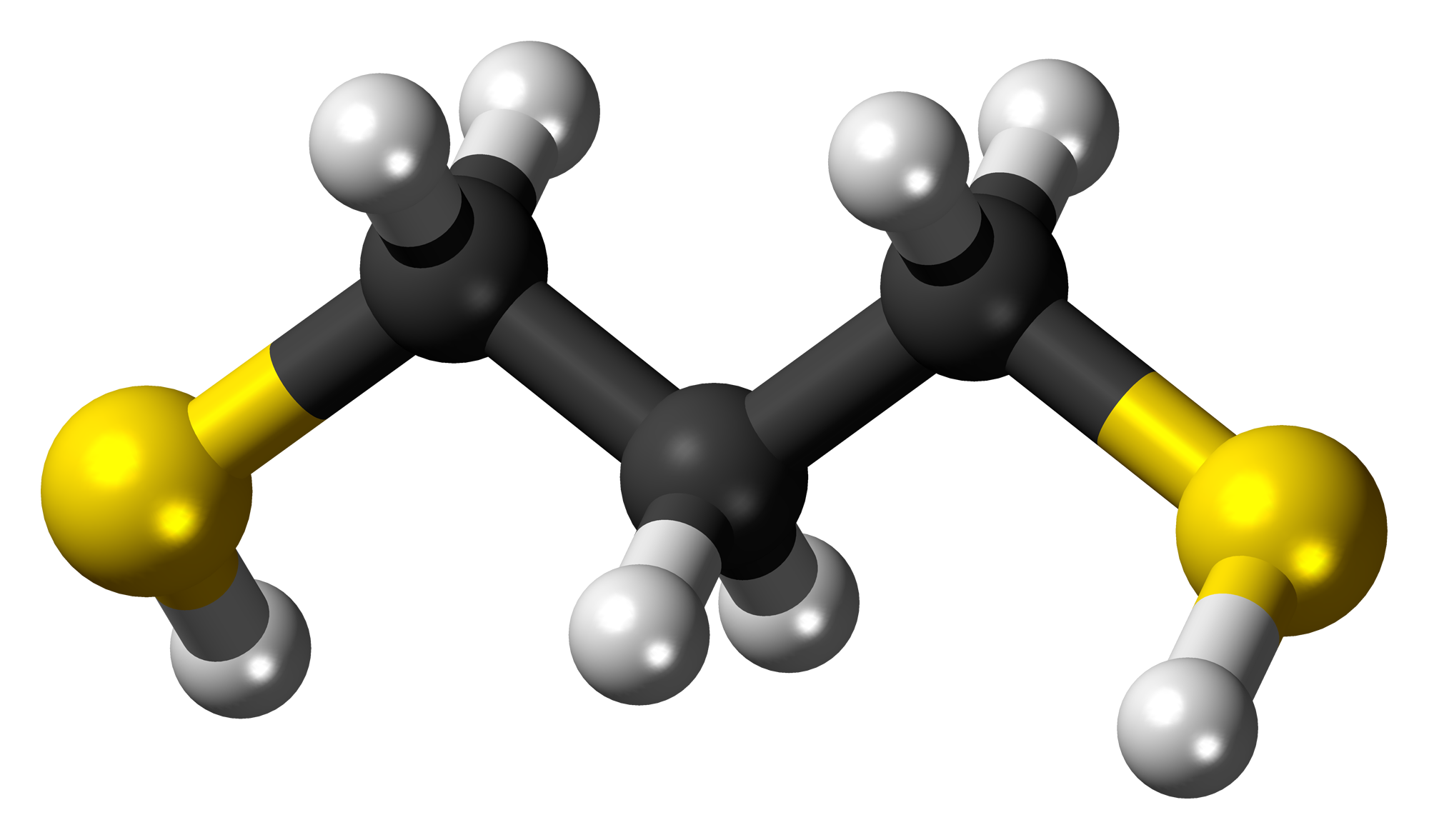

Names
- Preferred IUPAC name Propane-1,3-dithiol
- Other names 1,3-Dimercaptopropane

Identifiers
CAS Number	109-80-8
3D model (JSmol)	Interactive image
ChEBI	CHEBI:44864
ChEMBL	ChEMBL1235209
ChemSpider	13848090
ECHA InfoCard	100.003.371
EC Number	203-706-9
PubChem CID	8013
RTECS number	TZ2585500
UNII	R4LUJ82U52
UN number	3336
CompTox Dashboard (EPA)	DTXSID0059376
- InChI: InChI=1S/C3H8S2/c4-2-1-3-5/h4-5H,1-3H2 Key: ZJLMKPKYJBQJNH-UHFFFAOYSA-N; InChI=1/C3H8S2/c4-2-1-3-5/h4-5H,1-3H2 Key: ZJLMKPKYJBQJNH-UHFFFAOYAS
- SMILES: SCCCS

Properties
Chemical formula	C_{3}H_{8}S_{2}
Molar mass	108.22 g·mol^{−1}
Appearance	Colorless liquid
Odor	Offensive
Density	1.078 g/cm^{3}
Melting point	−79 °C (−110 °F; 194 K)
Boiling point	169 °C (336 °F; 442 K)
Solubility in water	slight
Solubility in solvents	all organic solvents
Refractive index (n_{D})	1.539

Structure
Dipole moment	0 D

Hazards
- Occupational safety and health (OHS/OSH)
Main hazards	stench
- GHS labelling
Pictograms	(GHS07: Exclamation mark)
Signal word	Warning
Hazard statements	H302, H315, H319, H335
Precautionary statements	P261, P264, P270, P271, P280, P301+P312, P302+P352, P304+P340, P305+P351+P338, P312, P321, P330, P332+P313, P337+P313, P362, P403+P233, P405, P501
Flash point	138 °C (280 °F; 411 K)

Related compounds
Related compounds	1,2-ethanedithiol 1,2-propanedithiol lipoic acid
- Except where otherwise noted, data are given for materials in their standard state (at 25 °C [77 °F], 100 kPa). verify (what is ?) Infobox references

1,3-Propanedithiol is the chemical compound with the formula HSCH_{2}CH_{2}CH_{2}SH. This dithiol is a useful reagent in organic synthesis. This liquid, which is readily available commercially, has an intense stench.

== Reactions ==
1,3-Propanedithiol has been used for the protection of aldehydes and ketones via their reversible formation of dithianes. A prototypical reaction is its formation of 1,3-dithiane from formaldehyde. The reactivity of this dithiane illustrates the concept of umpolung. Alkylation gives thioethers, e.g. 1,5-dithiacyclooctane. The unpleasant odour of 1,3-propanedithiol has encouraged the development of alternative reagents that generate similar derivatives.

Oxidation gives not the 1,2-dithiolane, but the bis(disulfide).

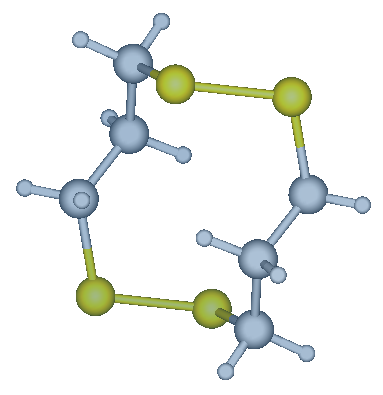
Structure of (C_{3}H_{6}S_{2})_{2}, the oxidized "dimer" of 1,3-propanedithiol.

1,3-Propanedithiol is used in the synthesis of tiapamil.

1,3-Propanedithiol reacts with metal ions to form dithiolates. Illustrative is the synthesis of the derivative diiron propanedithiolate hexacarbonyl upon reaction with triiron dodecacarbonyl:

Fe_{3}(CO)_{12} + C_{3}H_{6}(SH)_{2} → Fe_{2}(S_{2}C_{3}H_{6})(CO)_{6} + H_{2} + Fe(CO)_{5} + CO

== Safety ==
The stench of 1,3-propanedithiol can be minimized with bleach.

== See also ==
- 1,2-Propanedithiol
