= 1,2-Propanedithiol =

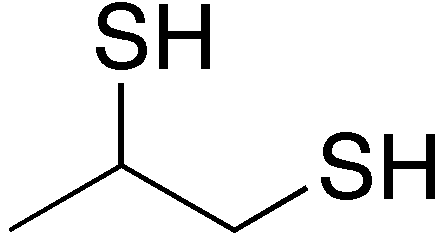

Names
- Preferred IUPAC name Propane-1,2-dithiol
- Other names 1,2-Dimercaptopropane

Identifiers
CAS Number	814-67-5
3D model (JSmol)	Interactive image
ChemSpider	55160
ECHA InfoCard	100.011.271
EC Number	212-398-5
PubChem CID	61217
UNII	GS64223D79
CompTox Dashboard (EPA)	DTXSID80862421
- InChI: InChI=1S/C3H8S2/c1-3(5)2-4/h3-5H,2H2,1H3 Key: YGKHJWTVMIMEPQ-UHFFFAOYSA-N; InChI=1/C3H8S2/c1-3(5)2-4/h3-5H,2H2,1H3 Key: YGKHJWTVMIMEPQ-UHFFFAOYAG
- SMILES: SCC(S)C

Properties
Chemical formula	C_{3}H_{8}S_{2}
Molar mass	108.22 g·mol^{−1}
Boiling point	152 °C (306 °F; 425 K)
Solubility in water	Insoluble
Solubility in organic solvents	soluble
Refractive index (n_{D})	1.531-1.541
- Except where otherwise noted, data are given for materials in their standard state (at 25 °C [77 °F], 100 kPa). verify (what is ?) Infobox references

1,2-Propanedithiol, sometimes called 1,2-dimercaptopropane, is a thiol with the formula HSCH_{2}CH(SH)CH_{3}. This colorless, intensely odorous liquid is the simplest chiral dithiol. Related dithiols include 1,2-ethanedithiol, 2,3-dimercapto-1-propanesulfonic acid, and 1,3-propanedithiol. It is generated by the addition of H_{2}S to the related episulfide, CH_{3}CHCH_{2}S.
