= Truffle oil =

Oil with truffles or synthetic flavouring

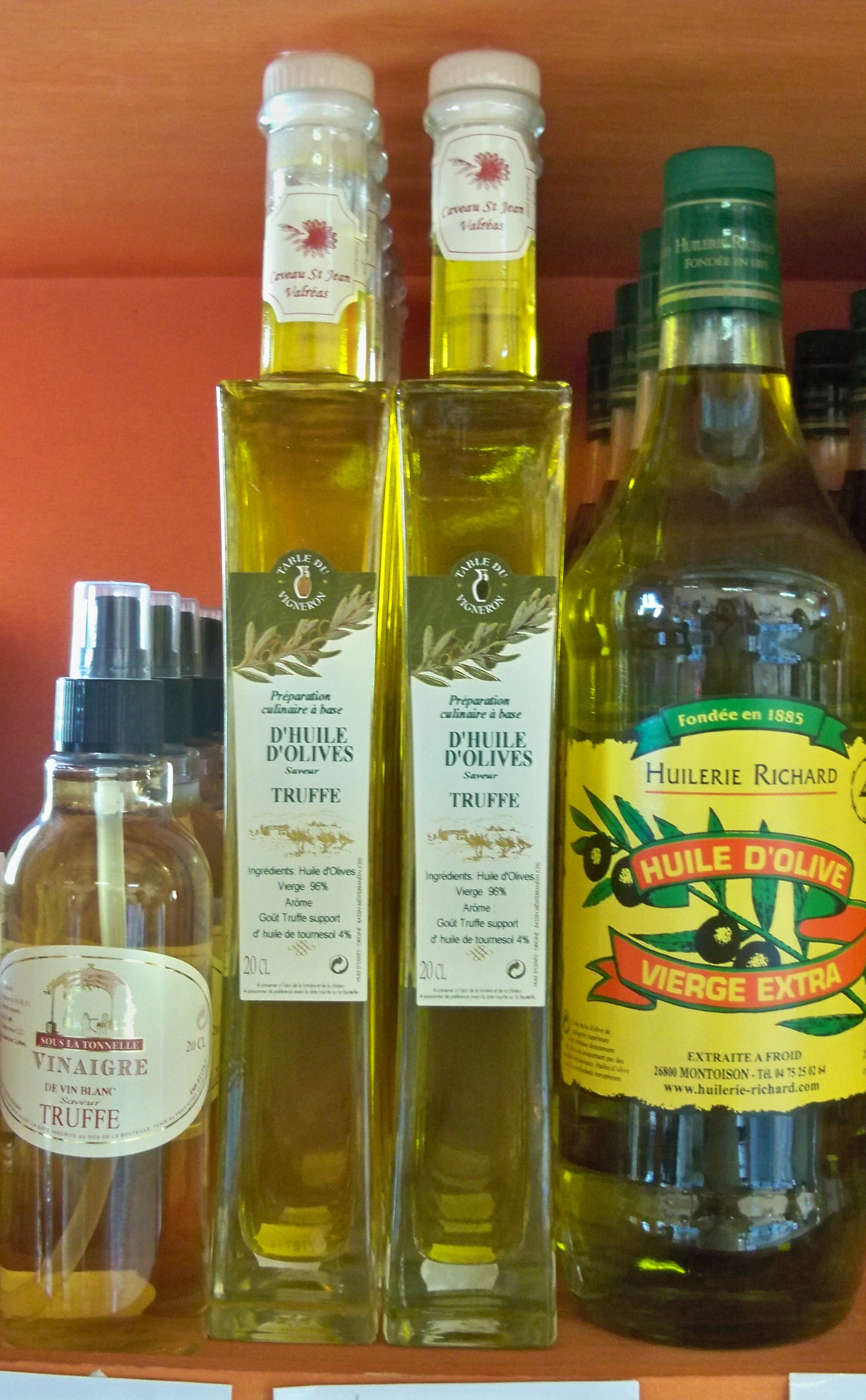
Truffle oils sold in Southern France

Truffle oil is a modern culinary ingredient used to impart the flavor and aroma of truffles to a dish. The ingredient is commonly used as a finishing oil in a variety of dishes, including truffle fries, pasta dishes, pizzas, and puréed foods such as mashed potatoes and deviled eggs. Truffle oil is available in all seasons and is significantly less expensive than fresh truffles. This has also led to a market growth in the product and an increase in the availability of truffle-flavored foods.

Truffle oil is controversial as a flavoring ingredient, as nearly all truffle oil is produced from one synthetic flavor compound (2,4-dithiapentane), and may lack the complex flavors and aromas of fresh truffles.

== Composition ==
Truffle oil can be produced using any oil. Common versions use olive oil, or a more neutral flavorless oil such as canola or grapeseed oil.

Some truffle oils are made with the residue of truffles collected or prepared for sale. Many truffle oils are not made from truffles, but instead use manufactured aromatic compounds including 2,4-dithiapentane (one of many aroma active compounds that can be found in some truffle varietals) with an oil base. There are no regulations regarding the labeling of 2,4-dithiapentane and it can legally be called truffle aroma, truffle flavor, truffle concentrate or other similar terms, even though it is not extracted from truffles. In the United States, the ingredient may use the modifiers "organic" or "natural" as long as the components meet the federal requirements for those terms.

The appearance of truffle oils is determined by the base oil, ranging from clear to cloudy and yellow to green. Some include a piece of truffle in the bottle. These pieces can be from any of over 200 different truffle species and may be listed as "black truffle" or "white truffle" even if not actually containing prized culinary varietals such as the black Périgord or white Alba truffle.

== History ==
Preserved truffles have a long history of use, as fresh truffles are seasonal, and require proper storage and careful use in order to maintain their rich flavors. Artificial truffle oils have been produced since the 1980s, around the time when truffles became internationally popular.

=== In foraging ===
Truffle oil is frequently used to train truffle-hunting dogs and pigs. Modern Italians often use a strufion, a ball of rags scented with truffle oil. Truffle oil made by infusing olive oil with truffles has been used for this purpose since at least 1756.

== Reception ==
Truffle oil has received a mixed response from chefs and food critics. In a New York Times opinion piece, chef Daniel Patterson wrote, "[truffle oil's] one-dimensional flavor is also changing common understanding of how a truffle should taste." Anthony Bourdain said, "Let it be stated here, unto forever and eternity, truffle oil is not food." He is also known for describing it as the "tomato ketchup of the middle class". Celebrity chef Martha Stewart expressed her dislike of truffle oil in a 2014 post on Reddit, stating "I think truffle oil is one of the few ingredients that doesn't belong in anyone's kitchen. It's ruinous of most recipes." Restaurateur Joe Bastianich said, "It's made by perfumists. It's garbage olive oil with perfume added to it, and it's very difficult to digest. It's bad for you. It's bad for New Yorkers. It's bad for the American people. So, stop it."

In 2009, celebrity chef Gordon Ramsay referred to natural truffle oil as "a chef's dream." In 2011, on the show MasterChef, he called the artificial truffle oil "one of the most pungent, ridiculous ingredients ever known to [a] chef."

Gareth Renowden, truffle grower and author of The Truffle Book, wrote that "truffle oil and the many truffle-flavored products that have come on to the market in the last few years are not necessarily bad, but they can lead to unrealistic expectations when you encounter the real thing. They offer a consistent experience, one you can guarantee to taste in the dish...they offer a simplified picture, a sort of cartoon version — bright and colourful but ultimately false".

The annual Australian Food Awards, awarded by the Royal Agricultural Society of Victoria, bans the use of 2,4-dithiapentane in entries for truffle-related categories.

In May 2017, a class action lawsuit was brought against Sabatino North America LLC, the largest truffle product manufacturer in the United States, alleging that the company used deceptive labeling implying to consumers that their truffle oils contained black or white truffles, although a DNA analysis confirmed that "Sabatino Truffle Oil does not contain any truffle whatsoever".
