= Youngsan University =

Private university in southeastern South Korea

Coordinates: 35.4288°N 129.1459°E

- Hangul: 영산대학교
- Hanja: 靈山大學校
- RR: Yeongsan daehakgyo
- MR: Yŏngsan taehakkyo

Youngsan University is a private university in southeastern South Korea. It operates a main campus in Yangsan City, South Gyeongsang province, a branch campus in nearby Busan, and an "auxiliary learning center" in Seoul. Youngsan offers undergraduate degrees in various practical fields, including international studies, law, Asian business, and information engineering. It also offers graduate degrees in legal affairs, hotel tourism management, information technology, real estate, and teaching English as a foreign language.

== History ==
The Sungsim School Foundation (est. 1973) received permission to open Youngsan University in 1996, and did so shortly thereafter, on March 10, 1997. The school was thus founded as a university, which is unusual; most South Korean universities began their existence as technical schools or colleges. The first president was Chun-koo Jeong. The first international sisterhood relationship was established later in the same year, with the International University of Russia. The maximum enrollment at that time was 940. Graduate schools were established in 1999.

== See also ==
- List of colleges and universities in South Korea
- Education in South Korea
