= C4H4O =

The molecular formula C_{4}H_{4}O may refer to:

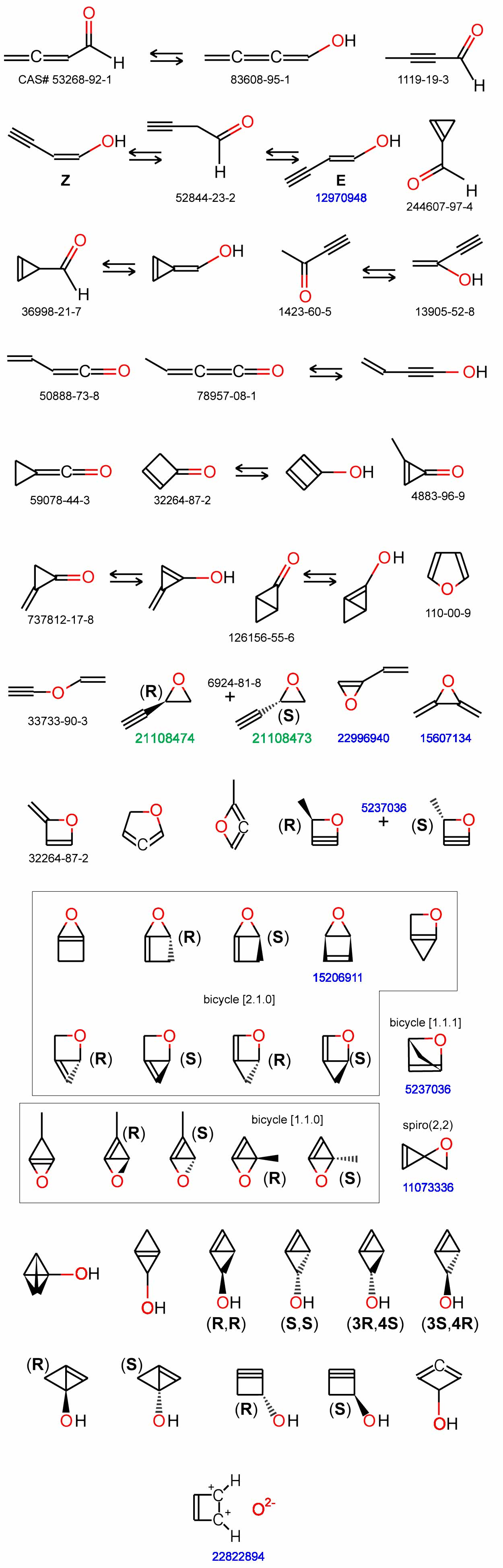
Theoretical isomers of C_{4}H_{4}O showing tautomerisation

- Butynone
- 1,3-Butadienal
- Cyclobutenone
- Furan
