= Vinylketenes =

Reactive class of chemicals

Vinylketenes are a class of chemical compounds where a vinyl group is conjugated to a ketene. Vinylketenes are key intermediates in the Danheiser benzannulation and Wulff-Dötz reaction, two routes to synthesis of phenols.

== Preparation ==
Vinylketenes are typically prepared in situ. Dehydrohalogenation of butenoyl chloride produces 1,3-butadienal, with substituted acyl chlorides likewise producing substituted vinylketenes; however, this method can be undesirable as the byproduct contains organic ammonium chloride derivatives that catalyse ketene polymerisation.

Vinylketenes may be prepared by electrocyclic ring opening of cyclobutenones. In the Danheiser benzannulation, vinylketene is produced via Wolff rearrangement of a vinyl-conjugated diazoketone.

== Reactions ==
Vinylketenes are highly reactive versus polymerisation, but can be stabilised as organometallic coordination complexes. Typically, the vinylketene is a tetrahaptic ligand similar to a diene. Vinylketenes can also exhibit dihapticity when prepared from η^{2}(C,O) ketene complexes via an intermediate vinylogous acylium complex.
