= C12H8O =

The molecular formula C_{12}H_{8}O (molar mass: 178.27 g/mol, exact mass: 178.1358 u) may refer to:

- Capillin
- Dibenzofuran
