= C2H3N =

The molecular formula C_{2}H_{3}N (molar mass: 41.05 g/mol, exact mass: 41.0265 u) may refer to:

- Acetonitrile (CH_{3}−C≡N)
- Methyl isocyanide, or isocyanomethane (CH_{3}−N≡C)
- Azirine (covering 2H-azirine, −CH_{2}−CH=N−, as well as its unstable tautomer 1H-azirine, −CH=CH−NH−)
- Ethenimine (H_{2}C=C=NH), an unstable tautomer of acetonitrile
- Ethynamine (HC≡C−NH_{2}), another unstable tautomer of acetonitrile
