= Danheiser benzannulation =

Chemical reaction used to create phenols

The Danheiser benzannulation is a chemical reaction used in organic chemistry to generate highly substituted phenols in a single step. It is named after Rick L. Danheiser who developed the reaction.

== Annulation ==
An annulation is defined as a transformation of one or more acyclic precursors resulting in the fusion of a new ring via two newly generated bonds. These strategies can be used to create aromatic systems from acyclic precursors in a single step, with many substituents already in place. A common synthetic annulation reaction is the Robinson annulation. It is a useful reactions for forming six-membered rings and generating polycyclic compounds. It is the combination of the Michael Addition and the Aldol Condensation reaction.

== Reaction development ==
Polysubstituted benzenes were originally synthesized by substitution reactions on aromatic precursors. However, these reactions can have low regioselectivity and are prone to over substitution. Directed ortho metalation requires precursors that are often unstable to metallating reagents. Both these synthetic routes pose issues in total synthesis. In 1984 a new synthetic strategy was developed by Rick Danheiser to address these shortcomings.

=== Reaction ===
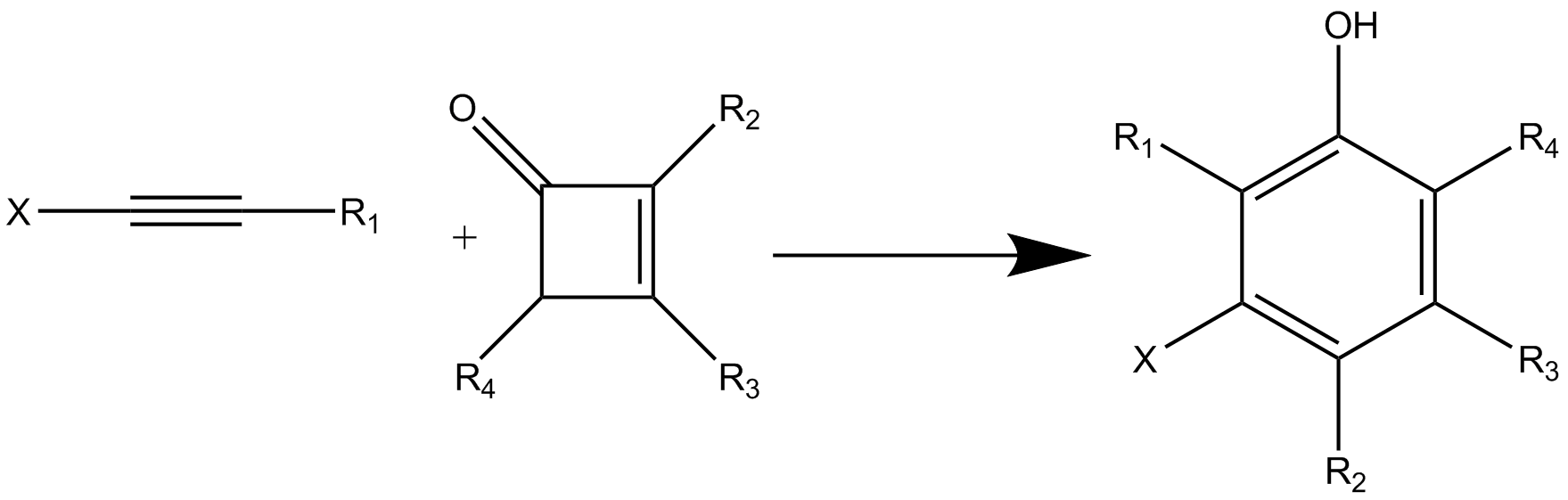
Scheme 1: Danheiser Benzannulation Reaction of an Alkyne and a Cyclobutenone(X= OR, SR, NR2)

The Danheiser benzannulation is a regiocontrolled phenol annulation. This annulation provides an efficient route to form an aromatic ring in one step. It is a thermal combination of a substituted cyclobutenones with heterosubstituted acetylenes to produce highly substituted aromatic compounds, specifically phenols or resorcinols (Scheme 1). This benzannulation reaction creates previously unaccessed aromatic substitution patterns. A variety of substituted aromatic rings can be prepared using this method including: phenols, naphthalenes, benzofurans, benzothiophenes, indoles, and carbazoles.

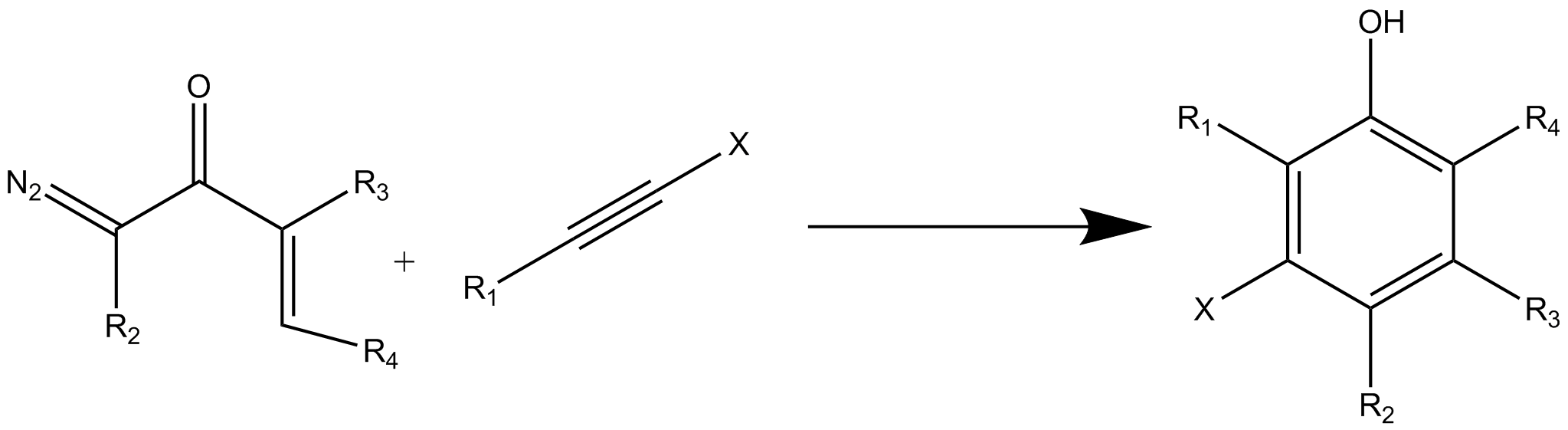
Scheme 2:Danheiser Benzannulation Reaction with an α-Diazo Ketone(X= OR, SR, NR2)

The modified Danheiser benzannulation allows the synthesis of polycyclic aromatic and heteroaromatic systems. This also includes naphthalenes, benzofurans and indoles. This second generation aromatic annulation is achieved by irradiation of a solution of acetylene and a vinyl or aryl α-diazo ketone in dichloroethane. This reaction utilizes the photochemical Wolff rearrangement of a diazoketone to generate an aryl or vinylketene. These ketene intermediates cannot be isolated due to their high reactivity to form diketenes. These rearrangements are performed in the presence of unsaturated compounds which undergo [2+2] cycloadditions with the in situ generated ketenes. When ketenes are formed in the presence of alkynes they proceed through pericyclic reactions to generate a substituted aromatic ring (Scheme 2). Avoiding the use of the high energy cyclobutenone starting materials provides access to a wider variety of substituted aromatic compounds.

This reaction is quite complementary to the Wulff–Dötz reaction. This is a [2+1] cycloaddition of a carbene to an alkyne or alkene (more specifically in the Dӧtz reaction a carbene coordinated to a metal carbonyl group) to produce substituted aromatic phenols.

=== Mechanism ===
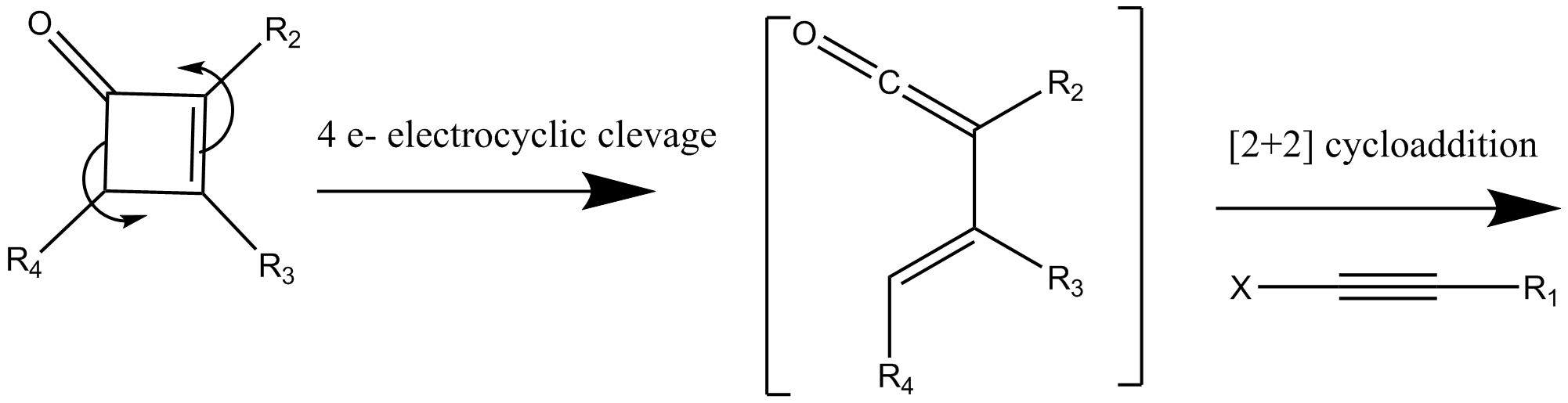
Scheme 3a: Reaction Mechanism of the Danheiser Benzannulation

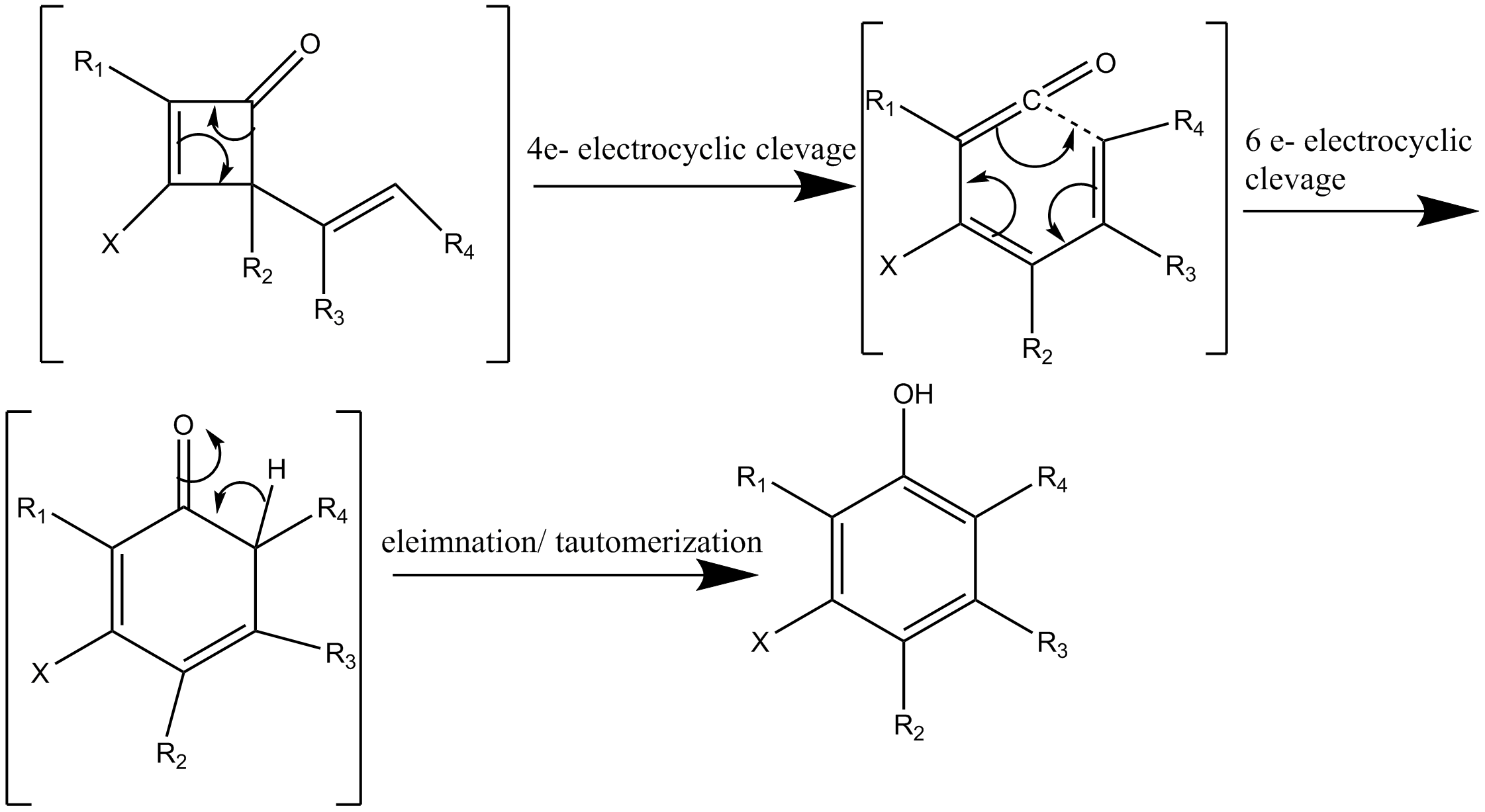
Scheme 3b: Mechanism of the Benzannulation Reaction

The reaction proceeds via a cascade of four subsequent pericyclic reactions (Scheme 3). Heating a cyclobutenone above 80 °C initiates a four-electron electrocyclic cleavage generating a vinyl ketene which reacts with an acetylene in a regiospecific [2+2] cycloaddition (Scheme 4). Reversible electrocyclic cleavage of the 2-vinylcyclobutenone yields a dienylketene. The dienylketene then undergoes a six-electron electrocyclization to give a hexadienone intermediate which rapidly tautomerizes to yield a highly substituted phenol or naphthol structures.

In the case of the modified benzannulation reaction (Scheme 5); irradiation of the diazoketones induces the Wolff rearrangement yielding the vinyl ketene intermediate which reacts with the acetylene in a [2+2] cycloaddition then a four-electron cleavage of the resulting 4-substituted cyclobutenone produces a dienylketene which then undergoes a six-electron electrocyclization to give the 2,4-cyclohexanedione which tautomerizes to the final aromatic product.

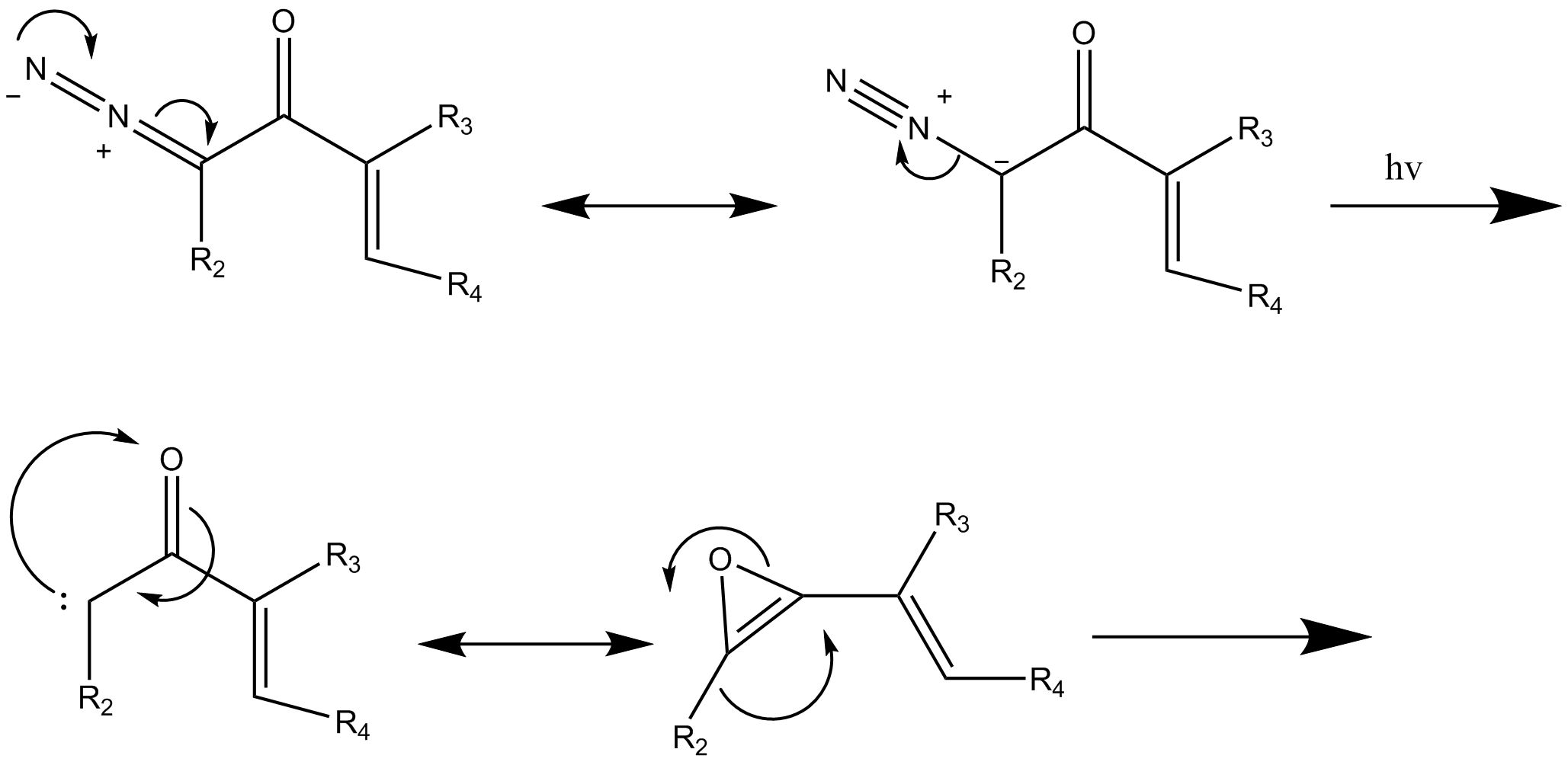
Scheme 5a:Mechanism for the Formation of the Vinyl Ketene (Wolff Rearrangement)

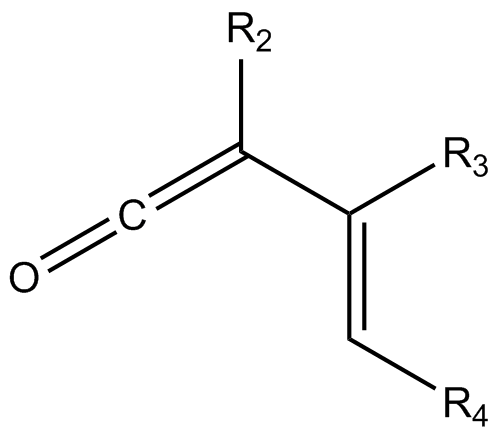
Scheme 5b: Vinyl Ketene

=== Reaction conditions ===
A typical Danheiser benzannulation reaction is run with a 0.4-2.0 M solution of the cyclobutenone in toluene heated at 80-160 °C with a slight excess of the cyclobutenone. Upon addition of the alkyne a [2+2] cycloaddition occurs. The crude annulation product is treated with 10% potassium hydroxide in methanol to saponify the ester side product formed from the reaction of the phenolic product with excess vinylketene (Scheme 6).

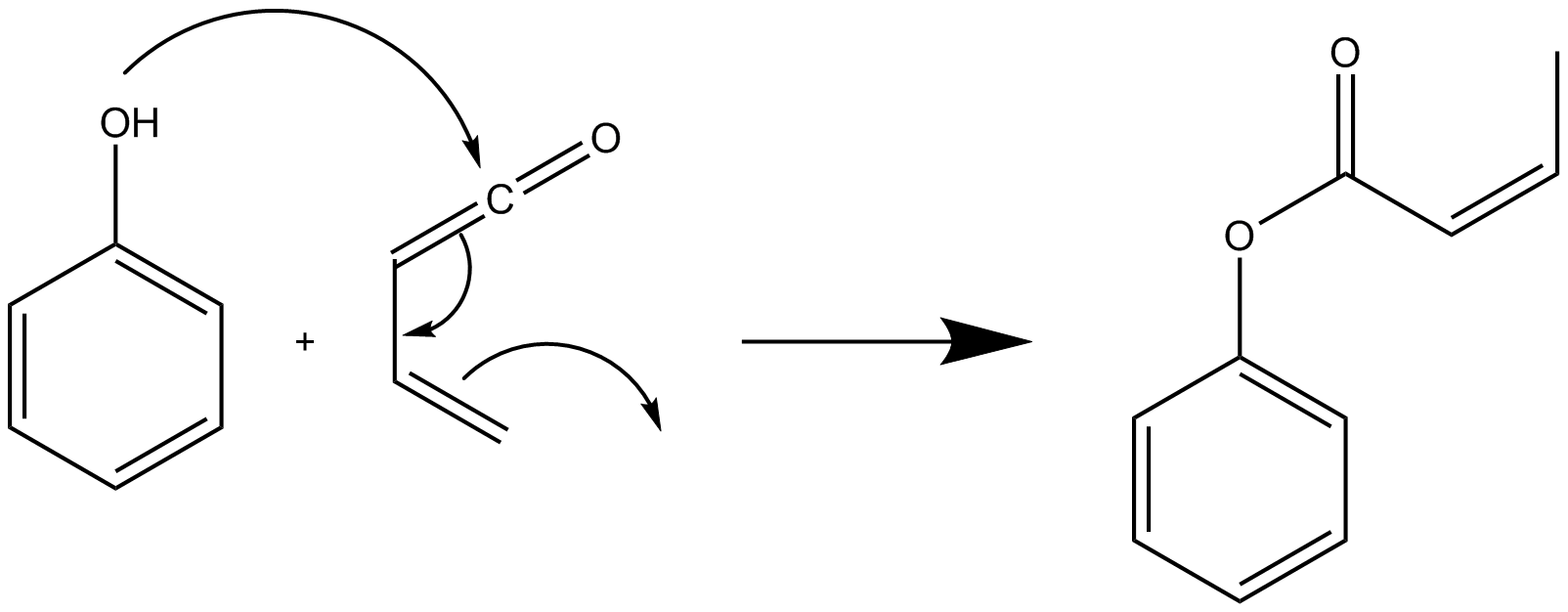
Scheme 6:Formation of the Ester Side Product

For the second generation reaction starting with the diazoketone, the reaction is performed by irradiation of a 0.7 M solution of the ketone with 1.0-1.2 equivalents of acetylene. A low-pressure mercury-vapor lamp at 254 nm in a photochemical reactor is used for 5–8 hours until all the diazoketone has been consumed as determined by TLC analysis. Dichloromethane, chloroform, and 1,2-dichloroethane, are all appropriate solvents for the annulation reaction.

== Reagent Preparations ==
Cyclobutenone was originally synthesized from the 3-bromocyclobutanone and 3-chlorocyclobutanone precursors which were prepared from an allene and a ketene via two independent routes. Scheme 7 shows the preparation from cyclobutenone from an allene.

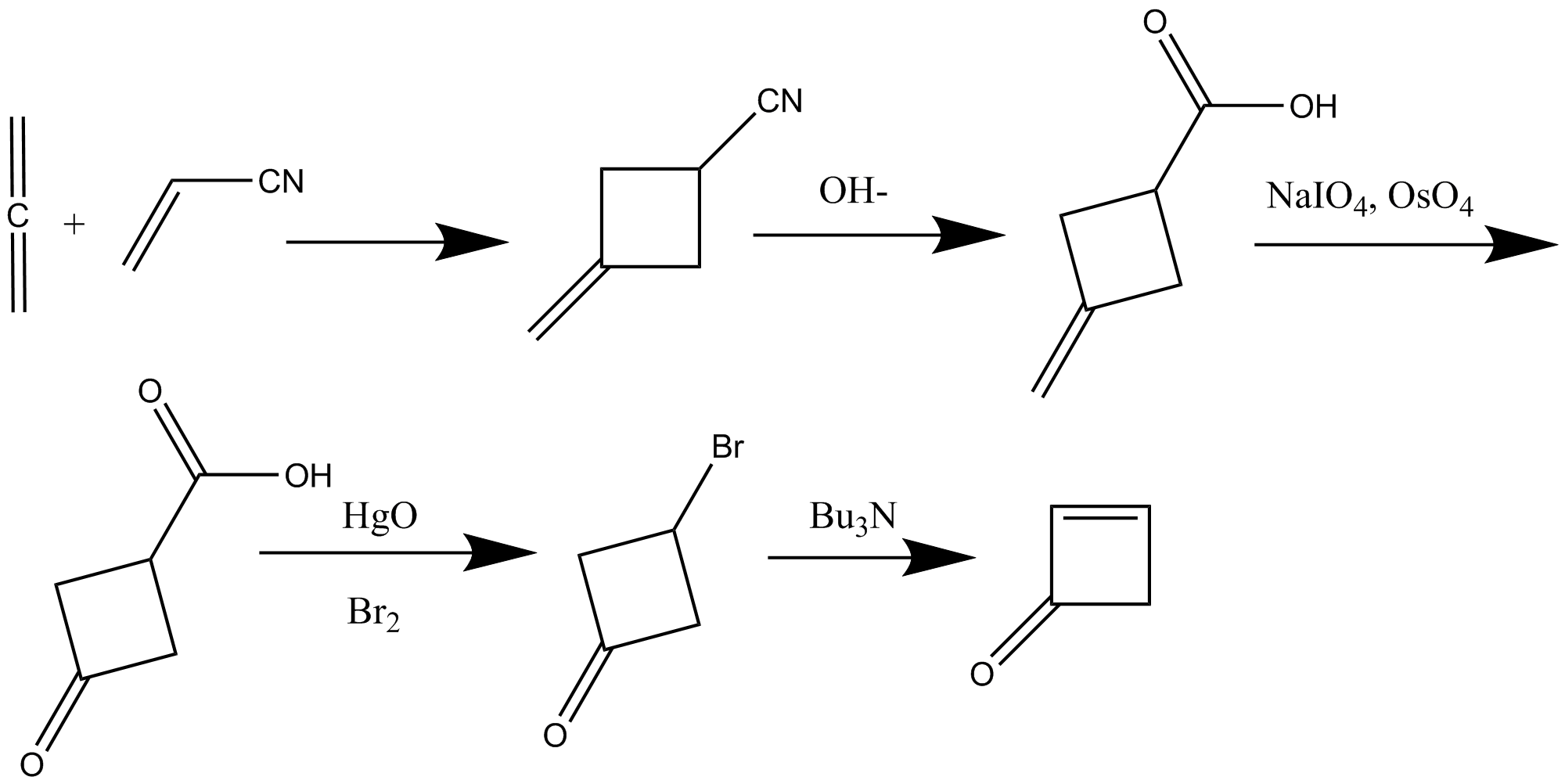
Scheme 7:Synthesis of Cyclobutenone

Activated alkyoxyacetylenes can be synthesized in a single-pot preparation of triisopropylsilyloxyacetylenes from esters. The silyloxyacetylenes are useful substitutes for alkoxyacetylenes in [2 + 2] cycloaddition reactions with ketenes and vinylketenes affording cyclobutenones (Scheme 8).

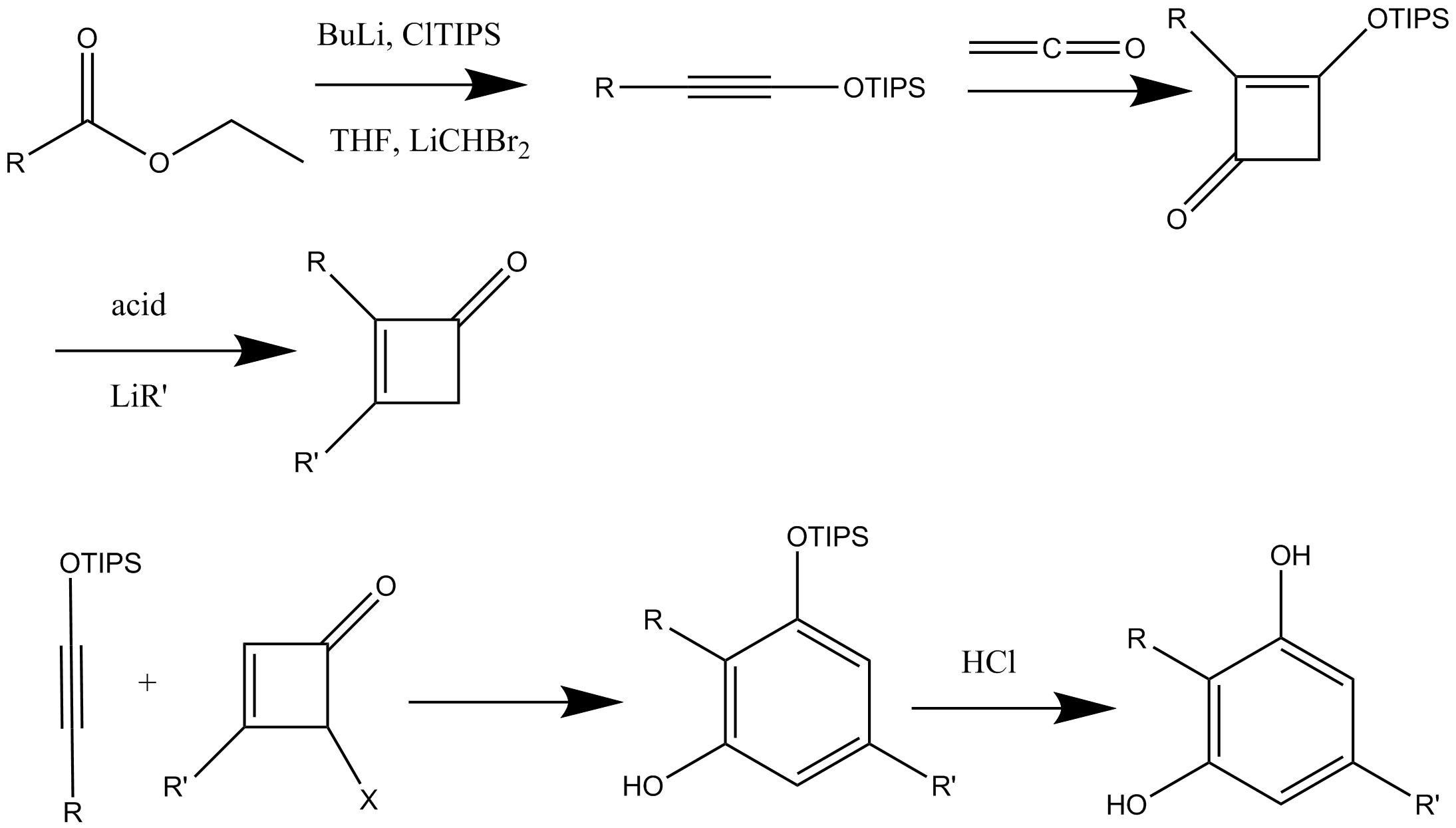
Scheme 8:Synthesis of Alkyoxyacetylenes and Conversion to Cyclobutenones

Diazoketones can be synthesized in one-step from readily available ketones or carboxylic acid precursors by the addition of diazomethane to acyl chlorides. A diazo group transfer method can be used to produce α,β-unsaturated ketones. The traditional method of the deformylative diazo transfer approach has been improved upon by substituting the trifluoroacetylation of generated lithium enolates for the Claisen formylation step. The key step in this procedure is activation of the ketone starting material to the corresponding α-trifluoroacetyl derivative using trifluoroethyltrifluoroacetate (TFEA) (Scheme 9).

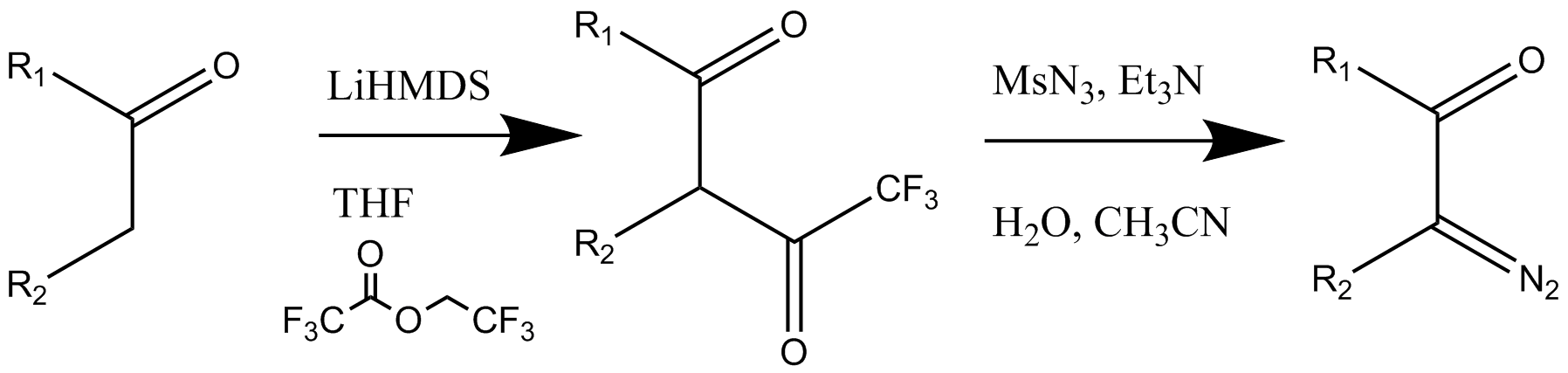
Scheme 9:Formation of Diazo Ketones by a Diazo Group Transfer Method

Alkynes or ketenophiles can be synthesized by various methods. Trialkylsilyloxyalkynes have proven to be excellent ketenophiles. These alkynes react in the annulation reaction to form resorcinol monosilyl ethers which can be de-protected under mild reaction conditions. Base-promoted dehydrohalogenation of (Z)-2-halovinyl ethers to form alkoxyacetylenes is one of the most well established routes of alkyne synthesis (Scheme 10).

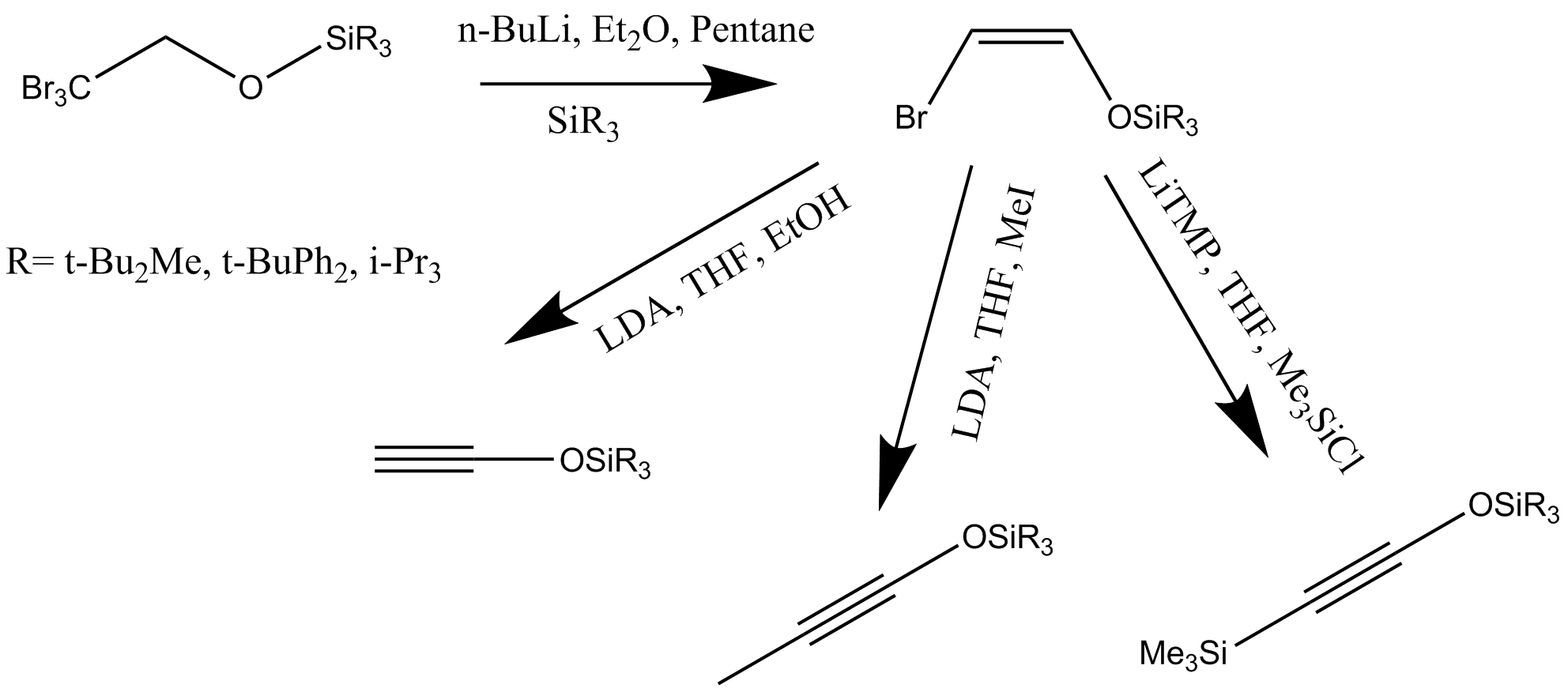
Scheme10:Synthesis of Trialkylsilyloxyalkynes

The synthesized alkynes are then heated in benzene or toluene in presence of excess cyclobutenone initiating the benzannulation reaction. Treatment with n-Bu_{4}NF in tetrahydrofuran removes the siloxy groups to form the desired diols.

== Scope ==
Alkynyl ethers and siloxyacetylenes have proven to be the ideal pair for aromatic annulations. The reactions can be run with both activated heterosubstituted alkynes and un-activated acetylenes. Alkynyl thioethers and ynamines have been used as reactants in the annulation reaction.

Conjugated enynes have also been used for benzannulation reactions catalyzed by cobalt. This type of benzannulation involves a [4+2] cycloaddition followed by a 1,3-hydrogen shift. In dichloromethane, the symmetrical benzannulation products are yielded but in tetrahydrofuran (THF), unsymmetrical benzannulation products were obtained with good regioselectivity. These reactions utilize 1,3-bis(diphenylphosphino)propane (dppp) substituted cobalt catalyst in the presence of powdered zinc and zinc iodide for a solvent dependent benzannulation reaction (Scheme 11). In dichloromethane the ratio of A:B is 78:22 with an overall combined yield of 90% and in THF the ratio has switched to 7:93 (A:B) with a combined yield of 85%.

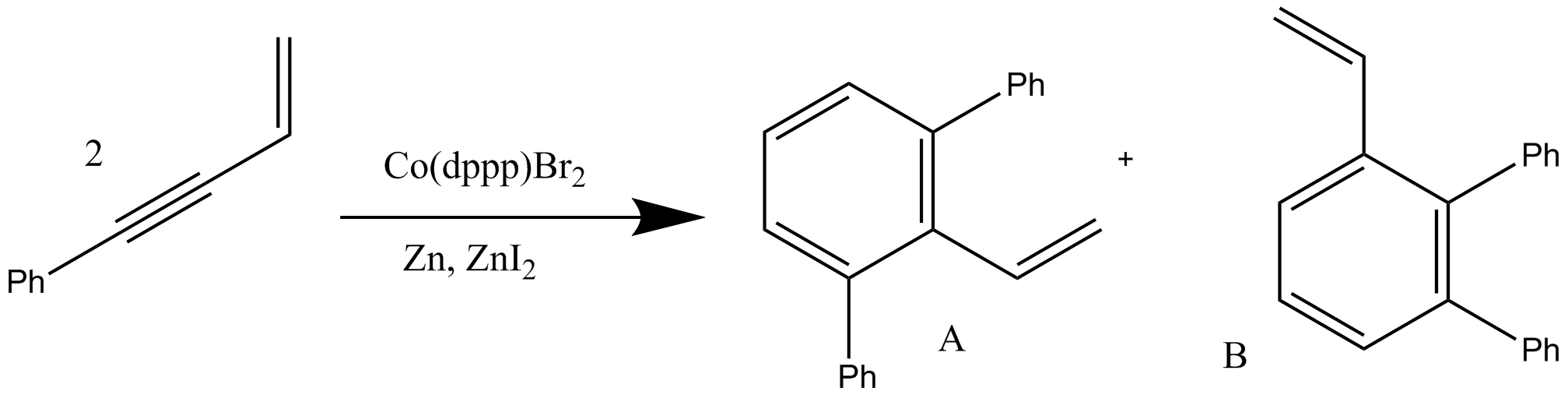
Scheme 11:Cobalt catalyzed Benzannulation Reaction

Palladium-catalyzed benzannulations have been developed using allylic compounds and alkynes. This palladium catalyzed reaction has been performed in both inter- and intramolecular forms. The cationic palladium complex [(η^{3}-C_{3}H_{5})Pd(CH_{3}CN)_{2}](BF_{4}) reacts with an excess of 4-octyne when heated to 80 °C in the presence of triphenylphosphine forming the aromatic compound 1-methyl-2,3,4,5-tetrapropylbenzene (Scheme 12). It was determined that the presence of exactly one equivalent of palladium catalyst (from which the allyl group adds into the final aromatic structure) is crucial for the catalyzed benzannulation to occur in good yield.

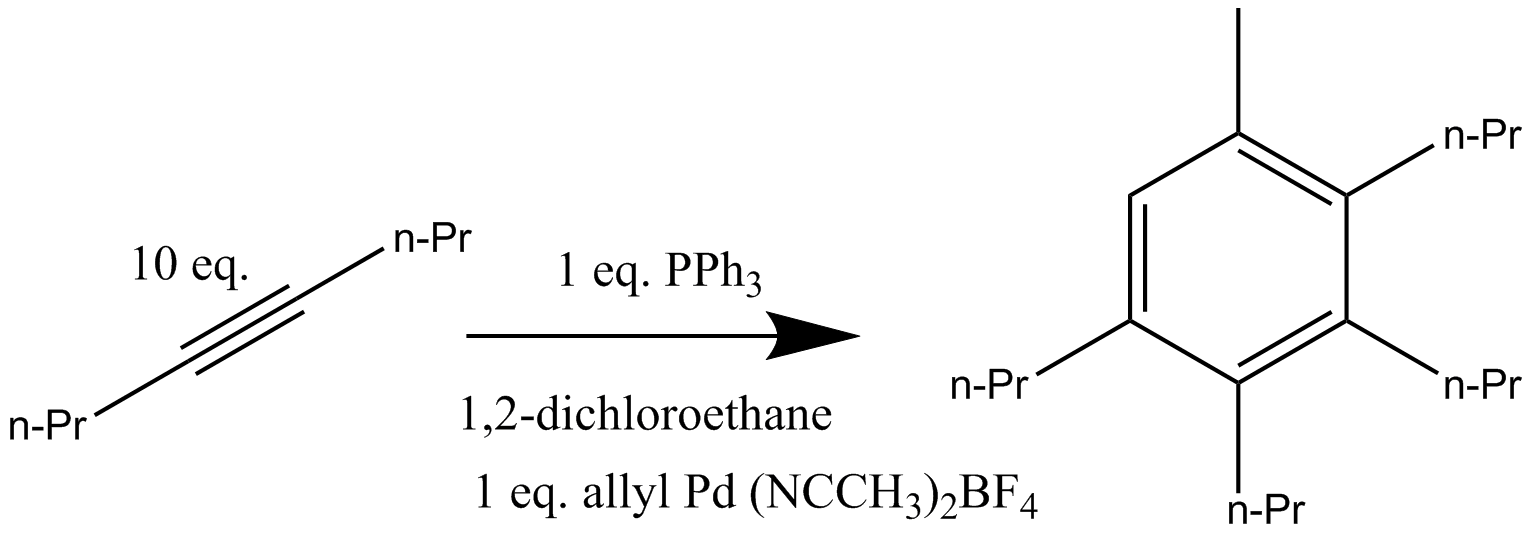
Scheme 12: Palladium catalyzed reaction with 4-octyne

This catalyzed reaction was also optimized for allyl substrates with catalytic [Pd_{2}(dba)_{3}]CHCl_{3} and triphenylphosphine (dba =dibenzylideneacetone) (Scheme 13).

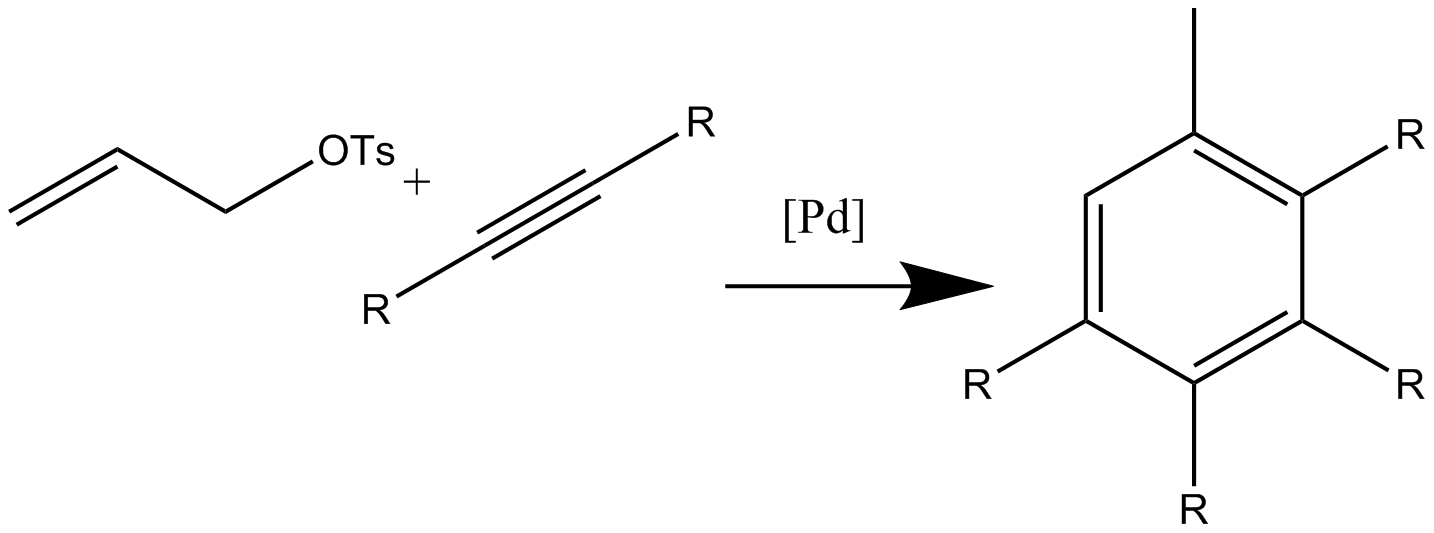
Scheme 13 Palladium Catalyzed

== Applications in Total Synthesis ==
Mycophenolic acid is a Penicillium metabolite that was originally prepared via a key benzannulation step. An alkyne and a cyclobutenone were reacted to form a substituted phenol in a single step in a 73% yield (Scheme 14). Mycophenolic acid was prepared in nine steps in an overall yield of 17-19%.

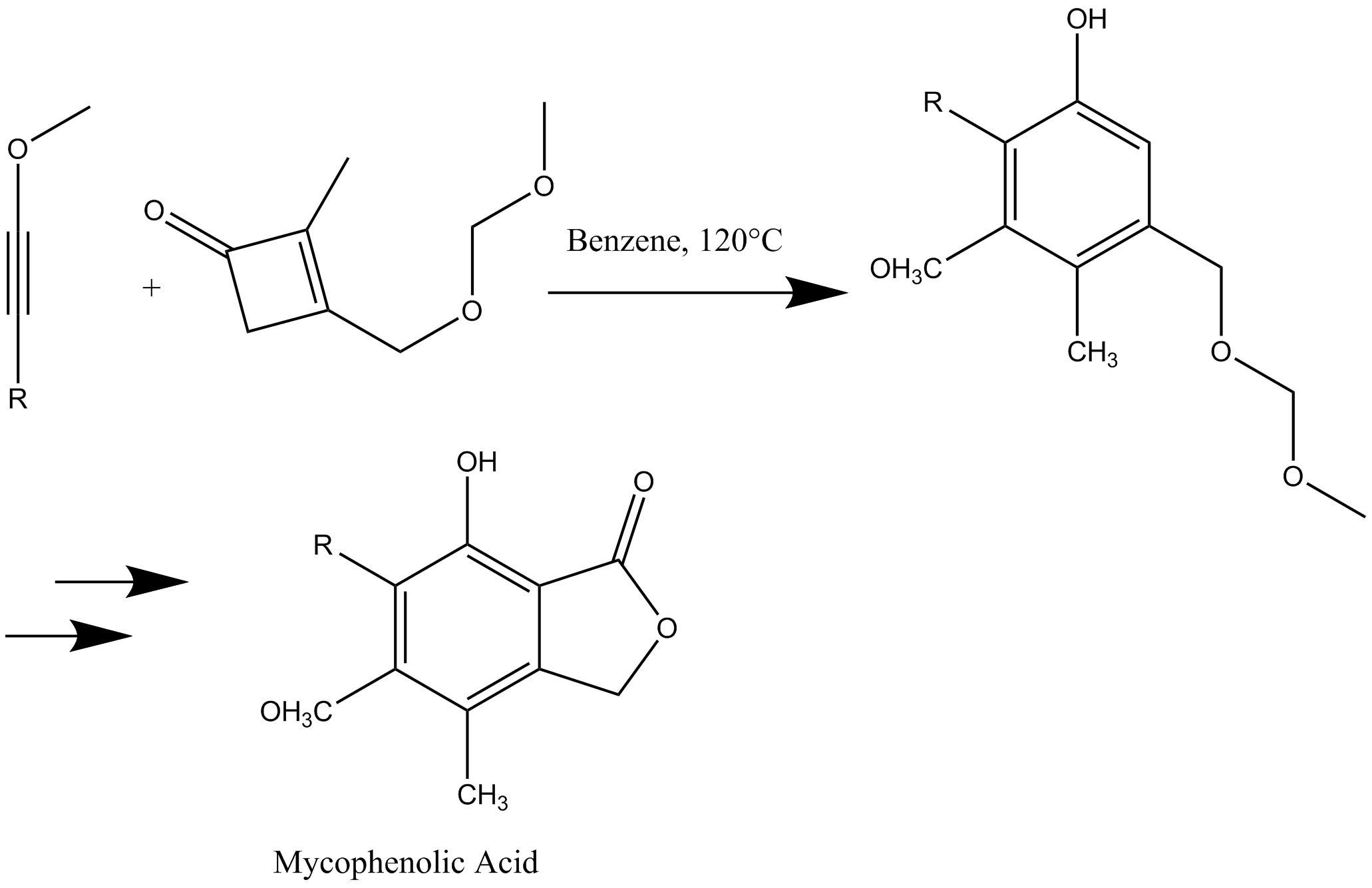
Scheme 14:Benzannulation Toward the Synthesis of Mycophenolic Acid

In the synthesis of highly substituted indoles performed by Danheiser, the key step was a benzannulation reaction using cyclobutenone and ynamides to produce highly substituted aniline derivatives. In this case, the ortho position can be functionalized with various substituents. Following the benzannulation reaction with various heterocyclization reactions can provide access to substituted indoles (Scheme 15).

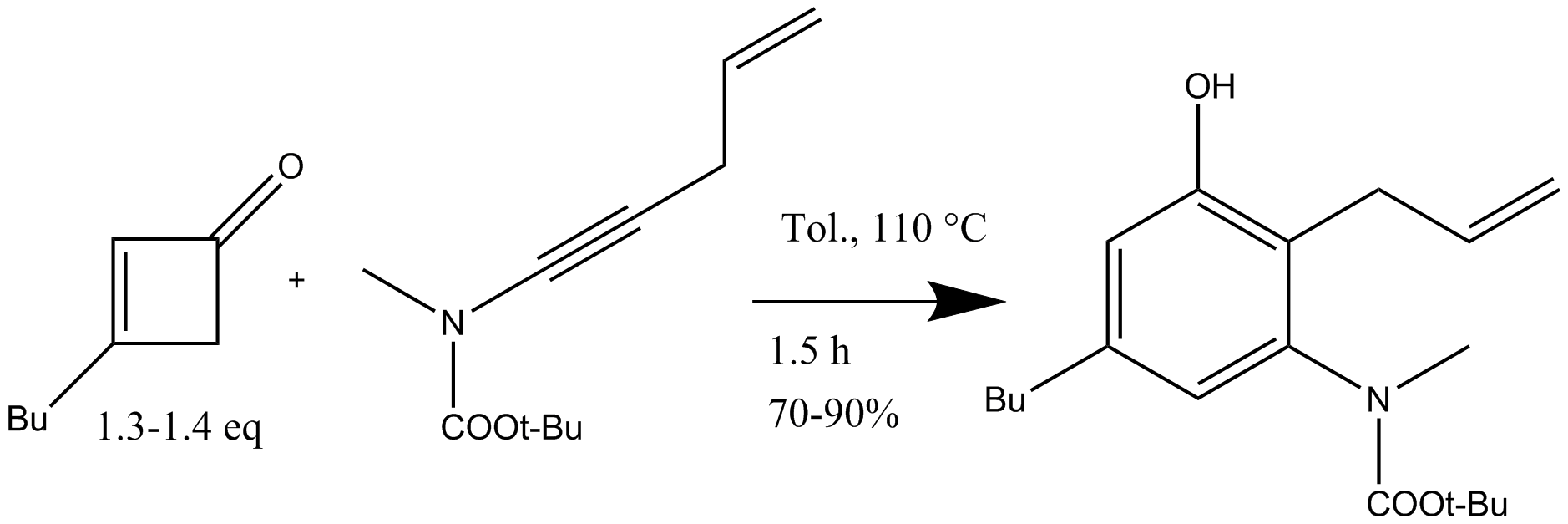
Scheme15a: Benzannulation Towards the Synthesis of Substituted Indoles

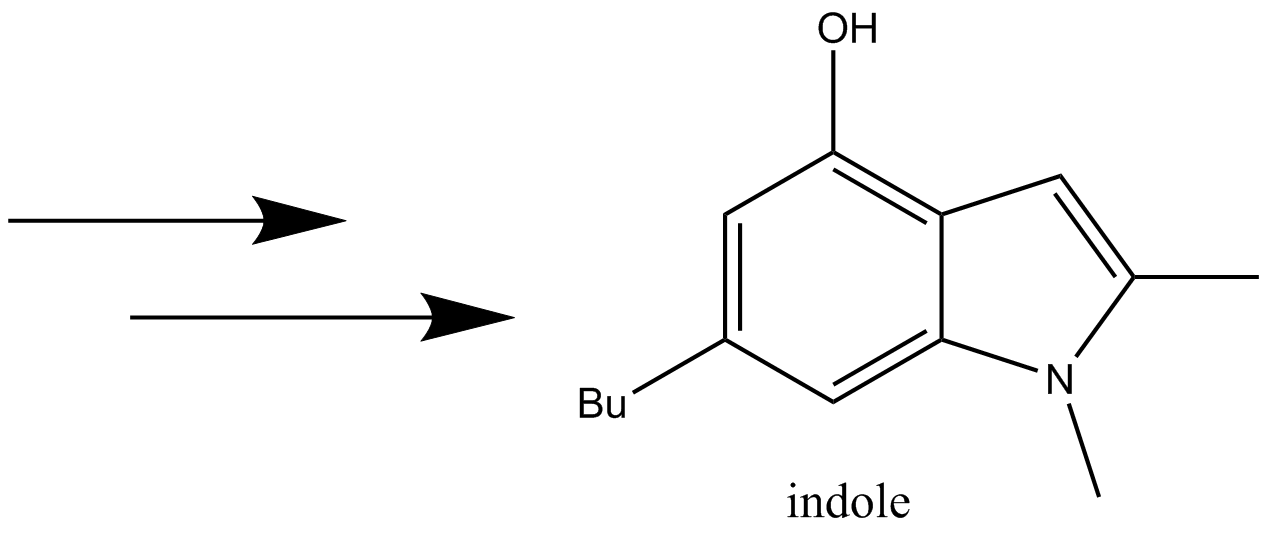
Scheme15b: Substituted Indole

Danheiser also used the benzannulation with ynamides for the synthesis of polycyclic benzofused nitrogen heterocycles followed by ring-closing metathesis (Scheme 16) for the total synthesis of (+)-FR900482, an anticancer agent.

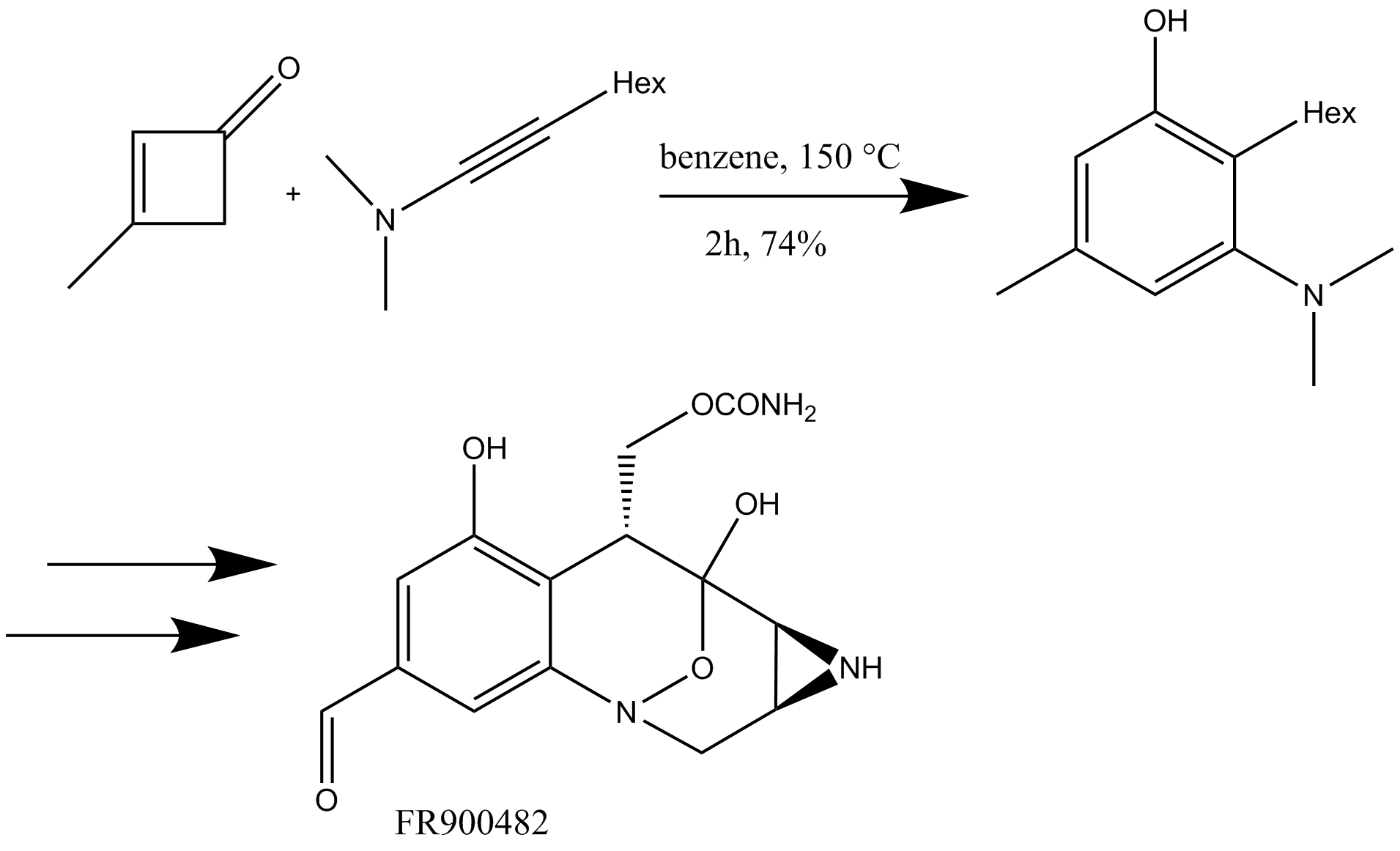
Scheme 16: Benzannulation Toward the Synthesis of FR900482

Kowalski used the benzannulation reaction with siloxyacetylenes for the first time, reacting them with cyclobutenones to synthesize a substituted phenol for the total synthesis of Δ-6-tetrahydrocannabinol (Scheme 17).

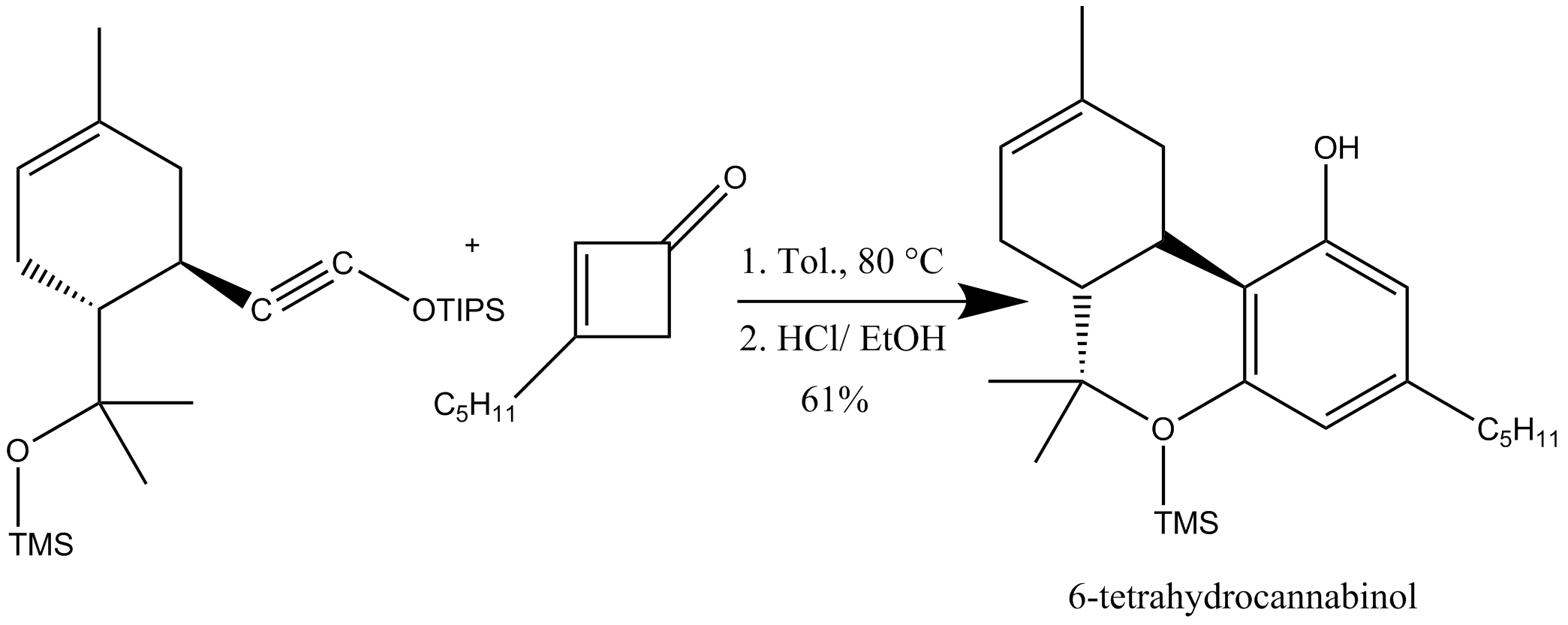
Scheme 17: Synthesis of Δ-6-tetrahydrocannabinol via a Benzannulatio

The benzannulation reaction was used by Smith in the total synthesis of cylindrocyclophanes specifically (−)-Cylindrocyclophane F. He utilized the reaction of a siloxyalkyne and a cyclobutenone to construct the dihydroxyl aromatic intermediate for an olefin metathesis reaction to access the target (Scheme 18).

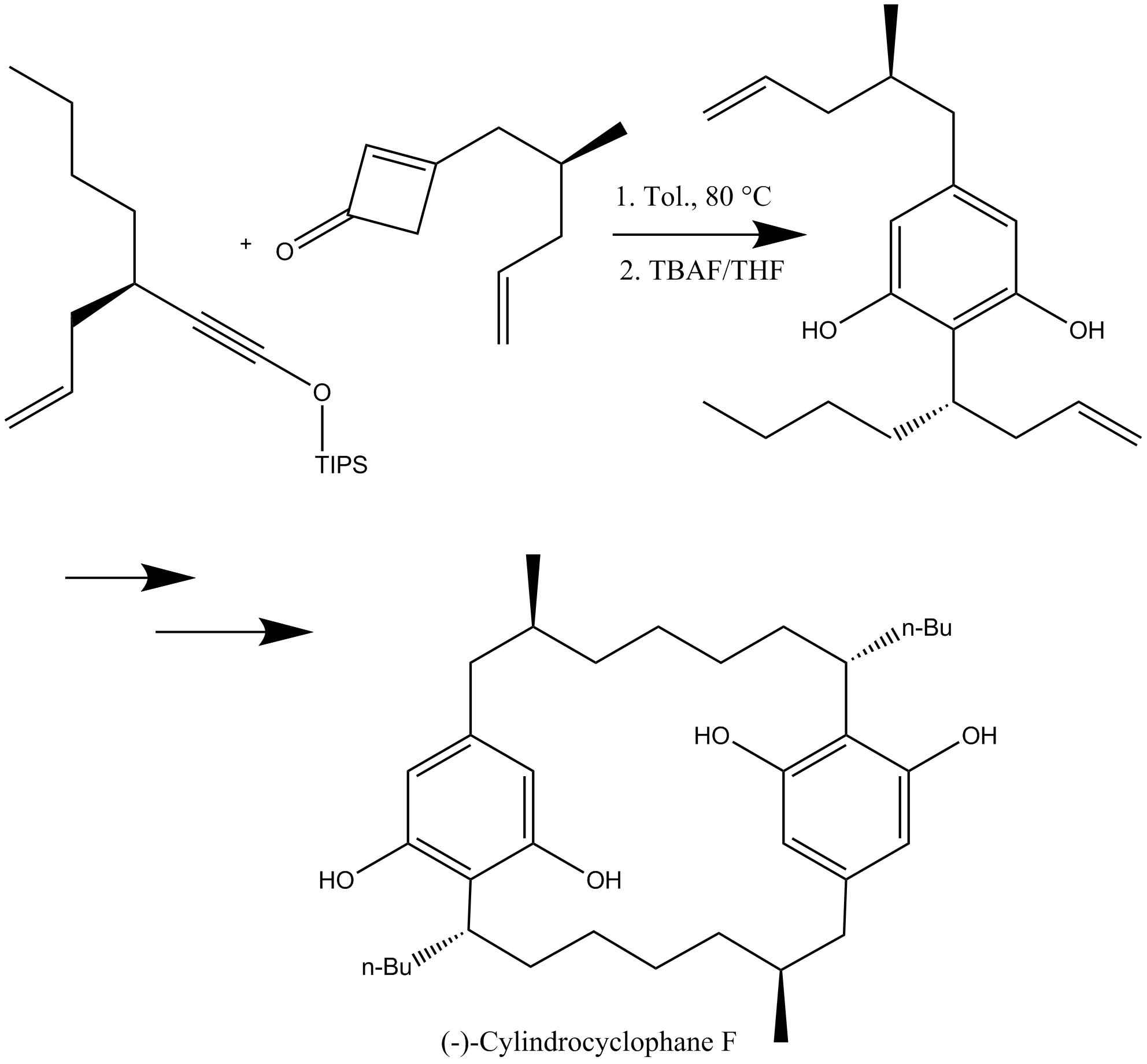
Scheme 18: Benzannulation towards the Synthesis of (−)-Cylindrocyclophane F

An outstanding application of Danheiser benzannulation in 6-step synthesis of dictyodendrins was demonstrated by Zhang and Ready. They obtained the cyclobutenone substrate using a hetero-[2+2] cycloaddition between aryl ynol ethers (aryl ketene precursors), and the following benzannulation enabled the rapid construction of the carbazole cole of dictyodendrins F, H and I. The successful usage of Danheiser benzannulation allows Zhang and Ready to achieve the so-far shortest synthesis of dictyodendrin natural products.

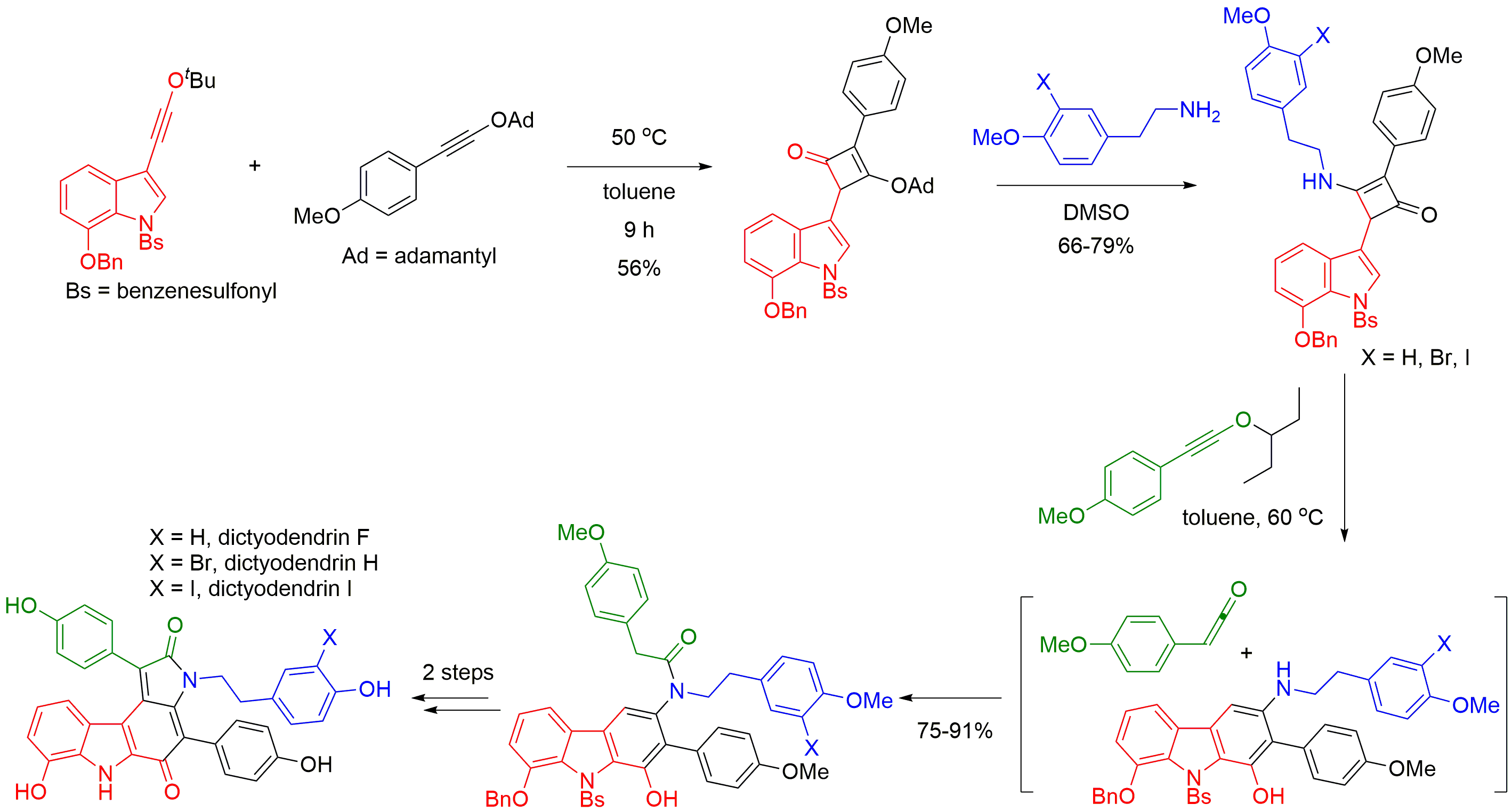
