= Organic Syntheses =

- Discipline: Organic chemistry
- Language: English
- Edited by: Rick L. Danheiser

Publication details
- History: 1921-present
- Publisher: Organic Syntheses, Inc., John Wiley & Sons
- Frequency: Annually (print), Upon acceptance (online)
- Open access: Yes

Standard abbreviations
- ISO 4: Org. Synth.
- NLM: Organic Synth

Indexing
- CODEN: ORSYAT
- ISSN: 0078-6209 (print); 2333-3553 (web)
- LCCN: 21017747
- OCLC no.: 611353626

Links
- Journal homepage; Journal page at publisher's website

Organic Syntheses is a peer-reviewed scientific journal that was established in 1921. It publishes detailed and checked procedures for the synthesis of organic compounds. A unique feature of the review process is that all of the data and experiments reported in an article must be successfully repeated in the laboratory of a member of the editorial board as a check for reproducibility prior to publication. The journal is published by Organic Syntheses, Inc., a non-profit corporation. An annual print version is published by John Wiley & Sons on behalf of Organic Syntheses, Inc.

== History ==
Prior to World War I, work on synthetic organic chemistry in the United States had been quite limited, and most of the reagents used in laboratories had to be imported from Europe. When export stoppages and trade embargoes cut off this source, Clarence Derick, a professor of chemistry at University of Illinois at Urbana-Champaign, began an effort to synthesize these needed chemicals in industrial quantities in a university laboratory with the help of a few graduate students. This work was performed during the summer break and came to be known as the "summer prep". Students who worked in the laboratory were paid and received credit.

The basic procedures were often obtained from textbooks, and the procedures were sketchy. Reproducibility was important in summer preps, so students were required to keep meticulous record books. The procedures were finally collected and published for the first time in a four-pamphlet set called Organic Chemical Reagents, which quickly sold out. The publishers received submissions from other chemists, which spawned the idea for serial publication, and the first annual volume of Organic Syntheses was thus published in 1921. By then, chemists from other universities and industry were also contributing.

One example of much needed chemicals were dyes for sensitizing photographic film. Research efforts in this field led to the foundation of Eastman Kodak Organic Chemicals Division.

The summer preps contributed to the war effort in World War II but were discontinued in 1950 because by then an infrastructure of chemical companies with their own research had been established.

Until 1998, Organic Syntheses was published only as an annual printed volume. In that year, all past volumes were made available on an open access website and new articles are now published online as soon as they are accepted.

== See also ==
- Organic Reactions
