= Staudinger synthesis =

Form of chemical synthesis

The Staudinger synthesis, also called the Staudinger ketene-imine cycloaddition, is a chemical synthesis in which an imine 1 reacts with a ketene 2 through a non-photochemical 2+2 cycloaddition to produce a β-lactam 3. The reaction carries particular importance in the synthesis of β-lactam antibiotics. The Staudinger synthesis should not be confused with the Staudinger reaction, a phosphine or phosphite reaction used to reduce azides to amines.

Reviews on the mechanism, stereochemistry, and applications of the reaction have been published.

== History ==
The reaction was discovered in 1907 by the German chemist Hermann Staudinger. The reaction did not attract interest until the 1940s, when the structure of penicillin was elucidated. The β-lactam moiety of the first synthetic penicillin was constructed using this cycloaddition, and it remains a valuable tool in synthetic organic chemistry.

== Mechanism ==
The first step is a nucleophilic attack by the imine nitrogen on the carbonyl carbon to generate a zwitterionic intermediate. Electron-donating groups on the imine facilitate this step, while electron-withdrawing groups impede the attack. The second step is either an intramolecular nucleophilic ring closure or a conrotatory electrocyclic ring closure. The second step is different from typical electrocyclic ring closures as predicted by the Woodward–Hoffmann rules. Under photochemical and microwave conditions the intermediate's 4π-electron system cannot undergo a disrotatory ring closure to form the β-lactam, possibly because the two double bonds are not coplanar. Some products of the Staudinger synthesis differ from those predicted by the torquoelectronic model. In addition, the electronic structure of the transition state differs from that of other conrotatory ring closures. There is evidence from computational studies on model systems that in the gas phase the mechanism is concerted.

== Stereochemistry ==
The stereochemistry of the Staudinger synthesis can be difficult to predict because either step can be rate-determining. If the ring closure step is rate-determining, stereochemical predictions based on torquoselectivity are reliable. Other factors that affect the stereochemistry include the initial regiochemistry of the imine. Generally, (E)-imines form cis β-lactams while (Z)-imines form trans β-lactams. Other substituents affect the stereochemistry as well. Ketenes with strong electron-donating substituents mainly produce cis β-lactams, while ketenes with strong electron-withdrawing substituents generally produce trans β-lactams. The ketene substituent affects the transition state by either speeding up or slowing down the progress towards the β-lactam. A slower reaction allows for the isomerization of the imine, which generally results in a trans product.

== Variations ==
Reviews on asymmetric induction of the Staudinger synthesis, including the use of organic and organometallic catalysts, have been published.

The imine can be replaced by adding olefin to produce a cyclobutanone, carbonyl to produce a β-lactone, or carbodiimides to produce 4-imino β-lactams. The Staudinger synthesis and variations are all ketene cycloadditions.

A one-pot, multicomponent Staudinger synthesis of β-lactams from azides and two diazo compounds was reported in 2014. The reaction occurs by a rhodium acetate-catalyzed reaction between the aryldiazoacetate (red) and the organic azide (blue) to form an imine. A Wolff rearrangement of the diazoacetoacetate enone (black) forms a stable ketene, which reacts with the imine to form a stable β-lactam compound. The solvent used for this reaction is dichloromethane (DCM) and the solution needs to rest for 3 hours at room temperature. The yield of the reaction is about 99%.

The reaction with sulfenes instead of ketenes leading to β-sultams is called Sulfa-Staudinger cycloaddition. The following illustration shows an example of the Sulfa-Staudinger cycloaddition. Benzylidenemethylamine reacts with ethanesulfonyl chloride to a β-sultam. For this reaction was tetrahydrofuran (THF) used as a solvent and the solution needed to rest for 24 hours.
