= Cylindrocyclophanes =

Cylindrocyclophanes are a class of cyclophane, a group of aromatic hydrocarbons composed of two benzene rings attached in a unique structure. Cylindrocyclophanes were the first cyclophanes found in nature, isolated from a species of cyanobacteria, and have proven to be an interesting group of compounds to study due to their unusual molecular structure and intriguing biological possibilities, especially its cytotoxicity to some cancer cell lines.

== Origin ==
Before the cylindrocyclophanes, the cyclophanes had all been produced synthetically. However, when a culture of the cyanobacteria Cylindrospermum lichenforme was being evaluated for antitumor activity, the extract was analyzed for new compounds, and a [7,7] paracyclophane was discovered. The structure of the cyclophane was determined and cylindrocyclophane A was named. A related class of compounds, the nostocyclophanes, were discovered during the same study but from another species of cyanobacteria, the Nostoc linckia. In a later study on the cytotoxicity of cyanobacterial compounds, an additional related class of compounds was discovered, the carbamidocyclophanes, from a Vietnamese species of Nostoc sp.

== Structure ==
Base structure of cylindrocyclophanes

Cylindrocyclophanes are all [7,7] paracyclophanes, differing only in the functional groups present on C-1, C-14, C-29, and C-33. There are currently 16 cylindrocyclophanes that have been identified: cylindrocyclophanes A - F, A_{4} - A_{1}, C_{4} - C_{1}, F_{4}, and A_{B4}.

Cylindrocyclophanes A-F differ only in the functional groups present on C-1 (R_{1}) and C-14 (R_{3}), and the only functional groups present are hydroxyl (OH) and acetoxy (OAc) groups. Cylindrocyclophanes A_{4} - A_{1}, C_{4} - C_{1}, F_{4}, and A_{B4} also have functional groups on C-29 (R_{4}) and C-33 (R_{2}) and differ from cylindrocyclophanes A-F mainly in their halogenated functional groups. See the following table for a complete list of functional groups for the known cylindrocyclophanes:

Cylindrocyclophane	R_{1}	R_{2}	R_{3}	R_{4}
A	OH	H	OH	H
B	OH	H	OAc	H
C	OH	H	H	H
D	OAc	H	OAc	H
E	OAc	H	H	H
F	H	H	H	H
A_{4}	OH	CHCl_{2}	OH	CHCl_{2}
A_{3}	OH	CH_{2}Cl	OH	CHCl_{2}
A_{2}	OH	CH_{3}	OH	CHCl_{2}
A_{1}	OH	CH_{3}	OH	CH_{2}Cl
C_{4}	OH	CHCl_{2}	H	CHCl_{2}
C_{3}	OH	CH_{2}Cl	H	CHCl_{2}
C_{2}	OH	CH_{3}	H	CHCl_{2}
C_{1}	OH	CH_{3}	H	CH_{2}Cl
F_{4}	H	CHCl_{2}	H	CHCl_{2}
A_{B4}	OH	CHBr_{2}	OH	CHBr_{2}

== Cytotoxicity ==
When cylindrocyclophane A was discovered, it was during an evaluation of the cyanobacteria Cylindrospermum licheniforme for antitumor activity. It was shown that Cylindrospermum licheniforme did indeed have moderate cytotoxicity again the KB and LoVo tumor cell lines, and this was attributed to cylindrocyclophane A. However, this cytotoxicity is not reserved only for tumor cells, which may limit its ability to be developed pharmaceutically. Since, as stated by Bui, et al., "cyanobacteria have been identified as one of the most promising sources of highly complex natural products" due to their biological activities, more insight has been gained into the mechanism behind the cylindrocyclophanes' cytotoxicity.

A team at the University of Illinois-Chicago studied the cytotoxicity of the cylindrocyclophanes further and determined that they may act as proteasome inhibitors., specifically inhibiting the 20S proteasome. Since the function of the proteasome is to break down damaged or unnecessary proteins, it is extremely important to the cells' ability to continue to proliferate. When the proteasome does not perform its function, apoptosis can result. The team at University of Illinois-Chicago determined that cylindrocyclophanes A_{4}, A_{3}, and A_{2} displayed the greatest inhibition of the proteasome, which they attributed to the dichloromethyl functional group present at R_{4}. When the cytotoxicity of cylindrocyclophanes A, C, F were examined, A was twice as effective as C, which was attributed to its two hydroxyl functional groups compared to only one for C and none for F. When the effectiveness of the dichloromethyl and hydroxyl functional groups were examined together, it was determined that the most effective arrangement was to have the dichloromethyl and hydroxyl groups "adjacent" spatially to each other.

== Synthesis ==
Since the cylindrocyclophanes have such a unique structure and exciting biological possibilities due to their cytotoxicity, there have been numerous efforts to create them synthetically in the laboratory. One of the first attempts was the total synthesis of cylindrocyclophane F, which was accomplished in 20 steps with an 8.3% yield. This, along with other syntheses of cylindrocyclophanes, relies on multistep reaction mechanisms, typically employing Myers reductive coupling and Kowalski ester homologation to obtain the beginning resorcinol fragments and Danheiser benzannulation to construct the aromatic rings with multiple functional groups. After the first total synthesis of cylindrocyclophane F, total synthesis of cylindrocyclophanes A and F were accomplished using a new olefin metathesis dimerization cascade. For synthesis of cylindrocyclophane F, this reduced the number of steps to 11 and increased the yield to 22%. This process was also able to be applied to the synthesis of cylindrocyclophane A in a 16-step reaction with an 8.1% yield. Significant increase in yield was accomplished when a head-to-tail cyclodimerization was paired with a Ramberg-Bäcklund reaction, resulting in a yield of 71% for A and 74% for F.
