= Ynone =

Organic compounds of the form RC≡CC(=O)R′

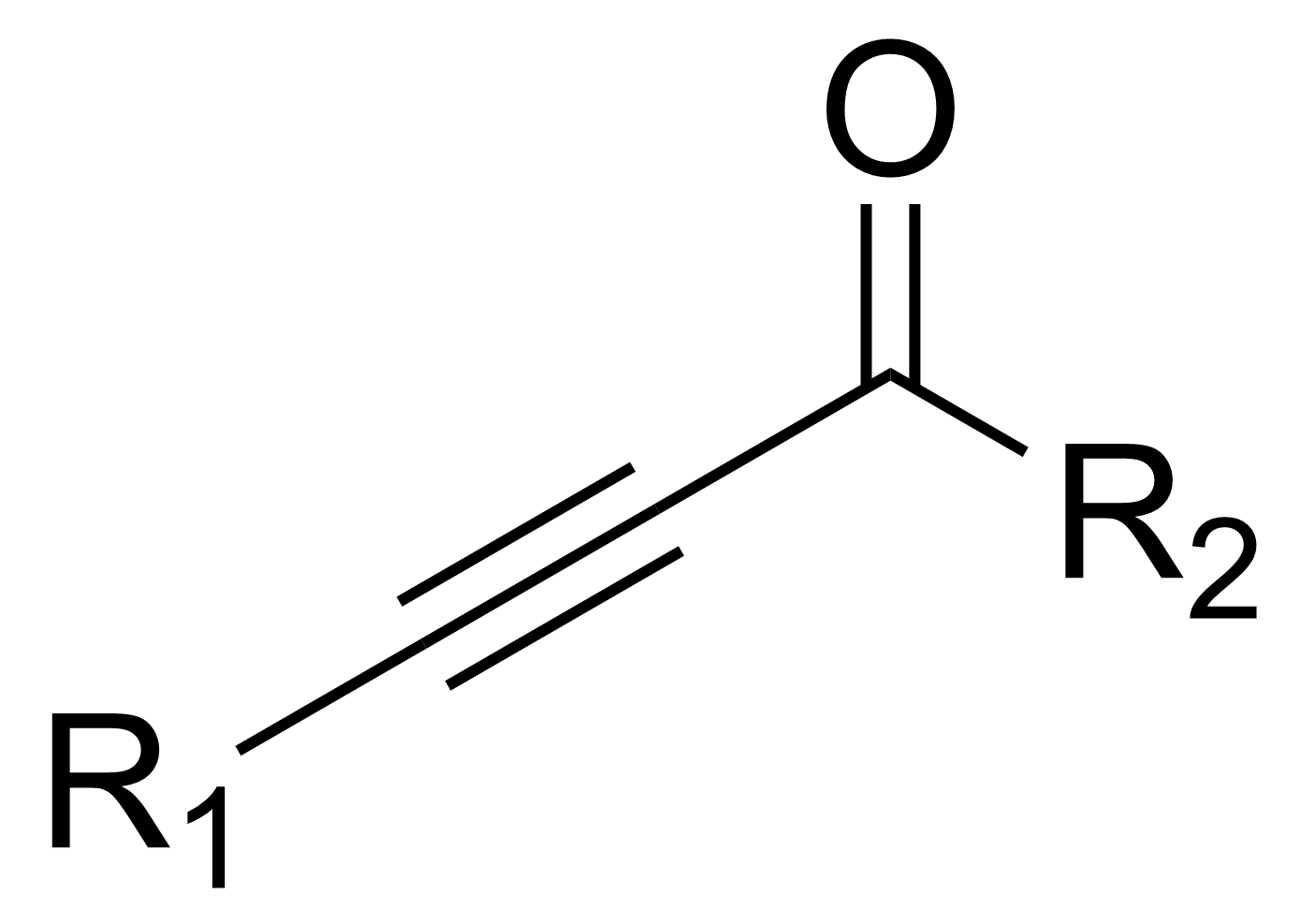
An ynone structure. R_{1} can be any organic group, R_{2} can be any except hydrogen (see ynal).

In organic chemistry, an ynone is an organic compound containing a ketone (>C=O) functional group and a C≡C triple bond. The simplest ynone is butynone.

Many ynones are α,β-ynones, where the carbonyl and alkyne groups are one bond apart, allowing them to form a conjugated system. Capillin is a natural example of a doubly conjugated ynone.

Non-conjugated ynones have additional sp^{3} carbon atoms between the carbonyl and alkyne groups which prevent conjugation.

== Synthesis of α,β-ynones ==
One method for synthesizing ynones is the acyl substitution reaction of an alkynyldimethylaluminum with an acyl chloride. An alkynyldimethylaluminum compound is the reaction product of trimethylaluminum and a terminal alkyne.

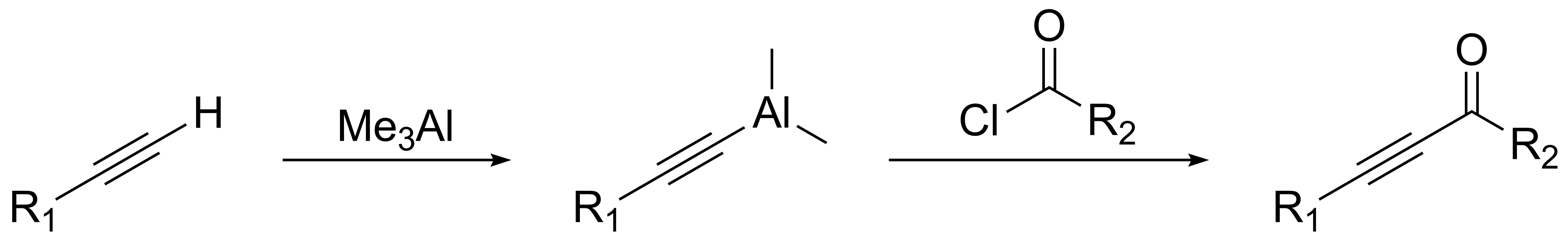
Synthesis of an ynone

An alternative is the direct coupling of an acyl chloride with a terminal alkyne, using a copper-based nanocatalyst:

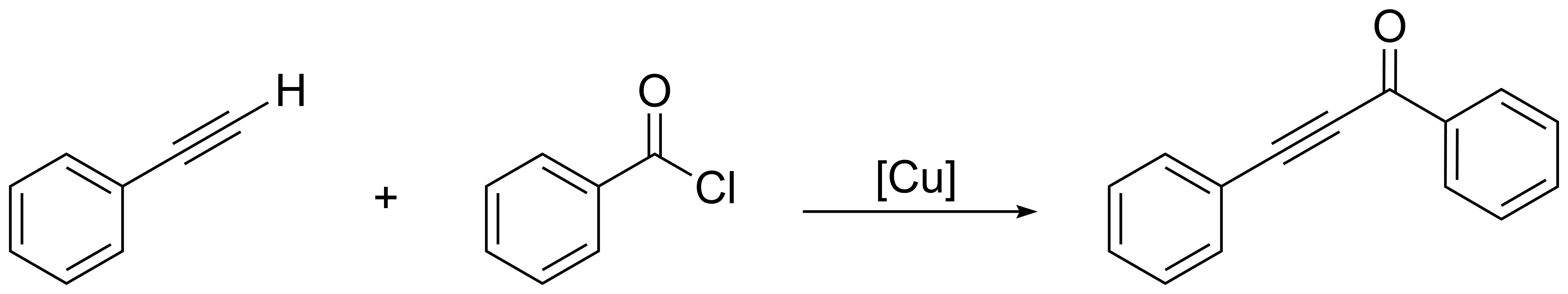
Synthesis of an ynone

Other methods utilize an oxidative cleavage of an aldehyde, followed by reaction with a hypervalent alkynyl iodide, using a gold catalyst.

An alternative but longer synthetic method involves the reaction of an alkynyllithium compound with an aldehyde. The reaction produces a secondary alcohol that then can be oxidized via the Swern oxidation.

== Synthesis of β,γ- and γ,δ-ynones ==
Terminal alkynes add across α,β-unsaturated ketones in the presence of palladium catalysts. The reaction affords γ,δ-ynones. Terminal alkynes add across epoxides to given yneols, which can be oxidized to give β,γ-ynones.

== See also ==
- Diketone
