= Rick L. Danheiser =

American organic chemist

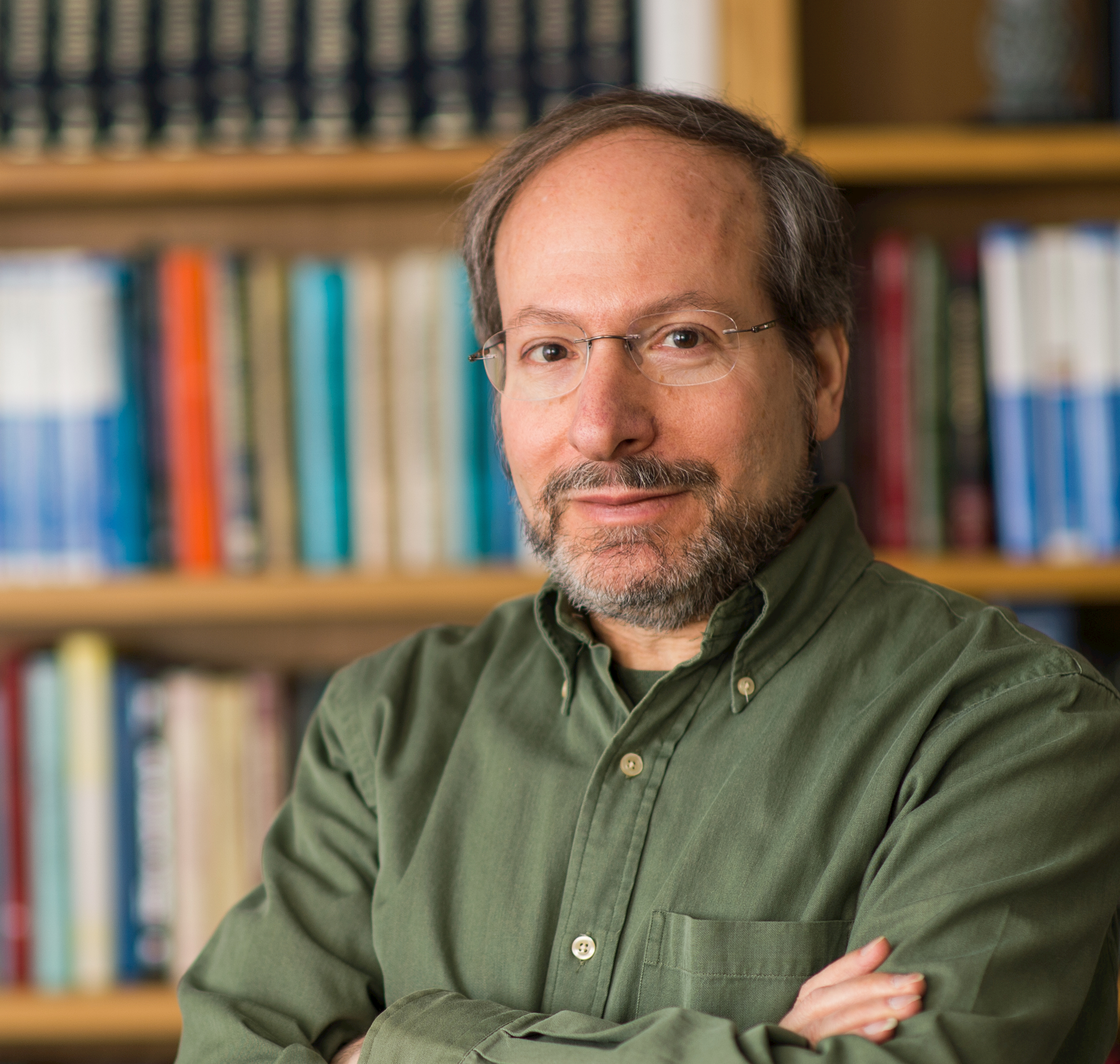
- Born: October 12, 1951 (age 74)
- Education: Columbia University (BA); Harvard University (PhD)
- Scientific career
- Fields: Organic chemistry
- Thesis: The Total Synthesis of Gibberellic Acid (1978)
- Doctoral advisor: E. J. Corey
- Other academic advisors: Gilbert Stork
- Notable students: James Nowick
- Website: danheiserlab.mit.edu

Rick L. Danheiser is an American organic chemist and is the Arthur C. Cope Professor of Chemistry at the Massachusetts Institute of Technology and chair of the MIT faculty. His research involves the invention of new methods for the synthesis of complex organic compounds. Danheiser is known for the Danheiser annulation and Danheiser benzannulation reactions.

== Education ==
Danheiser was born in New York and received his B.A. in 1972 at Columbia College. While working as an undergraduate under the direction of Gilbert Stork, Danheiser developed a method for the regiospecific alkylation of beta-diketone enol ethers (the "Stork-Danheiser Alkylation"). and employed it in a total synthesis of the spiro sesquiterpene beta-vetivone. Danheiser received his Ph.D. at Harvard University in 1978. His doctoral research (under the direction of E. J. Corey) involved the first total synthesis of the diterpene plant growth hormone gibberellic acid.

== Research ==
Danheiser's research has focused on the development of new strategies for the synthesis of complex molecules and their application in the total synthesis of natural products. Synthetic methods invented in his laboratory include highly stereoselective [4 + 1] cyclopentene annulations based on oxyanion and carbanion-accelerated vinylcyclopropane rearrangements; the application of organosilanes (e.g., allenylsilanes, propargylsilanes, and allylsilanes) in a general [3 + 2] annulation strategy for the synthesis of five-membered carbocycles and heterocycles (the "Danheiser Annulation"); benzannulation strategies based on pericyclic transformations of vinylketenes (“Danheiser benzannulation”); methods for the synthesis of aromatic and dihydroaromatic compounds based on cycloadditions of highly unsaturated conjugated molecules such as conjugated 1,3-enynes; and formal [2 + 2 + 2] cycloadditions based on propargylic ene reaction/Diels-Alder cycloaddition cascades. Natural products synthesized in his laboratory at MIT include the neurotoxic alkaloids anatoxin a and quinolizidine 217A, the immunosuppressant agent mycophenolic acid the antitumor agent ascochlorin and a number of diterpene quinones derived from the Chinese traditional medicine Dan Shen.

== Notable research awards ==
Danheiser was awarded the Cope Scholar Award of the American Chemical Society in 1995. He is a Fellow of the American Chemical Society.

== Teaching and service ==
Danheiser has a particular interest in reproducibility in scientific research. He has been the editor-in-chief of the journal Organic Syntheses and a member of the board of directors of the Organic Syntheses corporation since 2004. Organic Syntheses has the unusual feature that all data and experiments reported in articles must be confirmed in the laboratory of a member of the editorial board prior to publication.

Danheiser has a longstanding interest in laboratory safety and at MIT he has served as the chair of several committees including the MIT Chemistry Department EHS Committee which was recognized in 1991 as the first recipient of the American Chemical Society Division of Chemical Safety national award for "best university safety program". Danheiser also served on the National Research Council Committee on Prudent Practices for the Handling, Storage and Disposal of Chemicals in Laboratories, chairing the Subcommittee on Assessing Chemical Hazards.

At MIT, Danheiser's educational contributions have been recognized with a MacVicar Faculty Fellowship, the School of Science Prize for Excellence in Undergraduate Teaching, the MIT Graduate Student Council Teaching Award, and the School of Science Prize for Graduate Education.
