= 1,1-Dihydroxyethene =

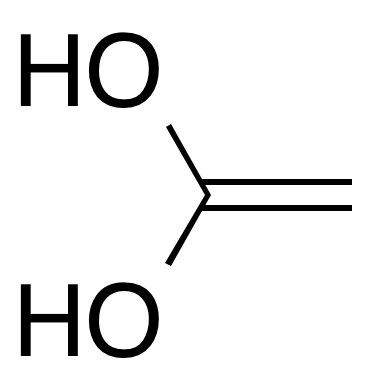

Names
- Preferred IUPAC name Ethene-1,1-diol
- Other names: 1,1-Dihydroxyethene; 1,1-Ethenediol; Ketene hydrate

Identifiers
CAS Number	10375-04-9
3D model (JSmol)	Interactive image
ChemSpider	91938
PubChem CID	101752
CompTox Dashboard (EPA)	DTXSID00275973
- InChI: InChI=1S/C2H4O2/c1-2(3)4/h3-4H,1H2 Key: LONYOMRPNGXPGP-UHFFFAOYSA-N
- SMILES: C=C(O)O

Properties
Chemical formula	C_{2}H_{4}O_{2}
Molar mass	60.052 g·mol^{−1}
- Except where otherwise noted, data are given for materials in their standard state (at 25 °C [77 °F], 100 kPa). Infobox references

1,1-Dihydroxyethene is an organic compound consisting of two hydroxy groups as substituents on the same carbon atom of an ethene chain. The chemical is also called ketene hydrate because it is the carbonyl hydrate of ketene. Its structure can also be considered as the enol form of acetic acid. This compound is likely a key intermediate in the hydration reaction that converts ketene into acetic acid. The analysis of the possible pathways for this reaction has been cited as an example of the importance of considering activation energy of each mechanistic step. The hydration of the carbonyl of ketene, which formally involves an addition reaction of one water molecule onto the carbonyl group, is likely catalyzed by a second water molecule. The compound has now been synthesized and identified spectroscopically.
