= 1,3-Butadienal =

Names
- IUPAC name Buta-1,3-dien-1-one
- Other names: 1,3-Butadienal; 1,3-Butadien-1-one; Vinylketene

Identifiers
CAS Number	50888-73-8
3D model (JSmol)	Interactive image
ChemSpider	125978
PubChem CID	142796
CompTox Dashboard (EPA)	DTXSID30198909
- InChI: InChI=1S/C4H4O/c1-2-3-4-5/h2-3H,1H2 Key: XGIVOKYSENAIBM-UHFFFAOYSA-N
- SMILES: C=CC=C=O

Properties
Chemical formula	CH_{2}CHCHCO
Molar mass	68.075 g·mol^{−1}
- Except where otherwise noted, data are given for materials in their standard state (at 25 °C [77 °F], 100 kPa). Infobox references

1,3-Butadienal, also called vinylketene, is an organic compound and the simplest vinylketene. Like other vinylketenes, it occurs primarily as a reactive intermediate in cycloaddition reactions.

== Preparation ==
As a vinylketene not protected by steric effects, 1,3-butadienal is typically prepared in situ. Dehydrohalogenation of vinyl acyl chlorides produces vinylketene:

H_{2}C=CH−CH_{2}−COCl → H_{2}C=CH−CH=C=O + HCl

The molecule was first properly observed in pyrolysis of the ynol ether ethoxybutenyne, a retro-ene reaction:

H_{2}C=CH−C≡C−O−C_{2}H_{5} → H_{2}C=CH−CH=C=O + C_{2}H_{4}

An analogous decomposition of ethoxyethyne yields ethenone. The compound also occurs from the radical addition of the allyl and COCl radicals, a potential side reaction in the production of allyl radicals from propene and oxalyl chloride. As a reaction intermediate, it is produced from electrocyclic ring-opening of cyclobutenone.
