= Capillin =

Names
- Preferred IUPAC name 1-Phenylhexa-2,4-diyn-1-one
- Other names Capillin

Identifiers
CAS Number	495-74-9
3D model (JSmol)	Interactive image
ChemSpider	9899
PubChem CID	10321
UNII	9JXZ3SJG0I
CompTox Dashboard (EPA)	DTXSID90197812
- InChI: InChI=1S/C12H8O/c1-2-3-5-10-12(13)11-8-6-4-7-9-11/h4,6-9H,1H3 Key: RAZOKRUZEQERLH-UHFFFAOYSA-N
- SMILES: CC#CC#CC(=O)C1=CC=CC=C1

Properties
Chemical formula	C_{12}H_{8}O
Molar mass	168.195 g·mol^{−1}
Melting point	82–83 °C (180–181 °F; 355–356 K)
Solubility in water	0.0177 mg/mL

Hazards
- Lethal dose or concentration (LD, LC)
LD_{50} (median dose)	1 mg/kg (IV, mice)
- Except where otherwise noted, data are given for materials in their standard state (at 25 °C [77 °F], 100 kPa). Infobox references

Capillin is a toxic naturally occurring organic compound with the chemical formula C_{12}H_{8}O. The structure contains acetophenone and a polyyne (pentadiynyl) portion, conjugated together as an ynone.

== Chemical taxonomy ==
Capillin is found in the essential oil of a number of Artemisia species, including Artemisia monosperma and Artemisia dracunculus (tarragon). The substance was initially isolated from Artemisia capillaris in 1956.

== Applications ==
Capillin is a biologically active substance. It has strong antifungal activity, and it is possibly antitumoral. Capillin exhibits cytotoxic activity and could cause apoptosis of certain human tumor cells.
