= Ketenimines =

Class of chemical compounds

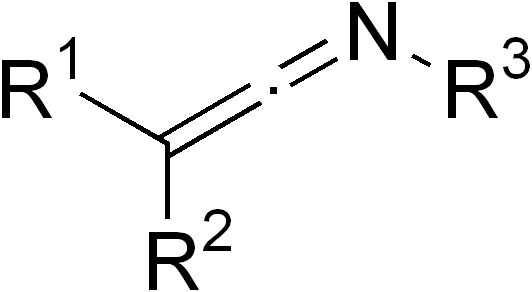
General structure of a ketenimine

Ketenimines are a group of organic compounds with the general structure R_{2}C=C=NR'. A ketenimine is a cumulated alkene and imine and is related to an allene and a ketene. When the substituents on the terminal carbon differ, the ketenimines are intrinsically chiral owing to the non-linearity of the C=N-R group. The parent compound, ketenimine, tautomerizes rapidly to acetonitrile.

== Synthesis ==
Ketenimines can be prepared by reactions of isocyanates with Wittig reagents:

Ph_{3}P=CR_{2} + R'N=C=O → R_{2}C=C=NR' + Ph_{3}PO (Ph = phenyl)

Similarly, aza-Wittig reagents react with ketenes to give ketenimines:

Ph_{3}P=NR' + R_{2}C=C=O → R_{2}C=C=NR' + Ph_{3}PO

This method was employed in the preparation of the first example of a ketenimine.

== Astronomical detection ==
The parent ketenimine (CH_{2}CNH) has a distinctive rovibrational spectrum. The ν_{8} and ν_{12} bands in the high-resolution FTIR spectrum are pair of Coriolis-coupled bands. They provide a rare example where intensity sharing between bands yields sufficient intensity for an otherwise invisible band (ν_{12}).
