= Butynone =

Names
- IUPAC name But-3-yn-2-one
- Other names: Butyn-2-one; Acetylacetylene; Methyl ethynyl ketone; Acetylethyne

Identifiers
CAS Number	1423-60-5
3D model (JSmol)	Interactive image
Beilstein Reference	605353
ChEBI	CHEBI:48060
ChemSpider	14294
ECHA InfoCard	100.014.395
EC Number	215-834-2
Gmelin Reference	49292
PubChem CID	15018
UNII	ST682FTU47
CompTox Dashboard (EPA)	DTXSID3074521
- InChI: InChI=1S/C4H4O/c1-3-4(2)5/h1H,2H3 Key: XRGPFNGLRSIPSA-UHFFFAOYSA-N
- SMILES: CC(=O)C#C

Properties
Chemical formula	HC_{2}COCH_{3}
Molar mass	116.072 g·mol^{−1}
Boiling point	85 °C (185 °F; 358 K)

Hazards
- GHS labelling
Pictograms	(GHS02: Flammable) ‍ (GHS06: Toxic) ‍ (GHS07: Exclamation mark)
Signal word	Danger
Hazard statements	H225, H300, H315, H319, H335
Precautionary statements	P210, P233, P240, P241, P242, P243, P261, P264, P270, P271, P280, P301+P310+P330, P303+P361+P353, P304+P340+P312, P305+P351+P338, P332+P313, P337+P313, P362, P370+P378, P403+P233, P403+P235, P405, P501
Safety data sheet (SDS)	Sigma-Aldrich Co., product no. 161314.
- Except where otherwise noted, data are given for materials in their standard state (at 25 °C [77 °F], 100 kPa). Infobox references

Butynone is an organic compound and the simplest ynone. It is a reagent used in organic synthesis as a dienophile and Michael acceptor.

== Preparation ==
The triisopropylsilyl derivative of butynone is prepared by oxidation of the corresponding derivative of 2-butynol, itself prepared from TIPS acetylene by deprotonation followed by nucleophilic addition to acetaldehyde.

== Applications ==
Butynone was one of the reagents used in the discovery of the Bohlmann–Rahtz pyridine synthesis.

Butynone and its derivatives participate in cycloaddition reactions, yielding a variety of heterocycles. The electron-deficient alkyne group participates in the azide-alkyne Huisgen cycloaddition to produce 1,2,3-triazine methyl ketones. [4+2+1] cycloaddition with 1,2-phenylenediamine and furfural derivatives gives benzodiazepine rings.
