= Ethenone =

Organic compound with the formula H2C=C=O

- Structural formula

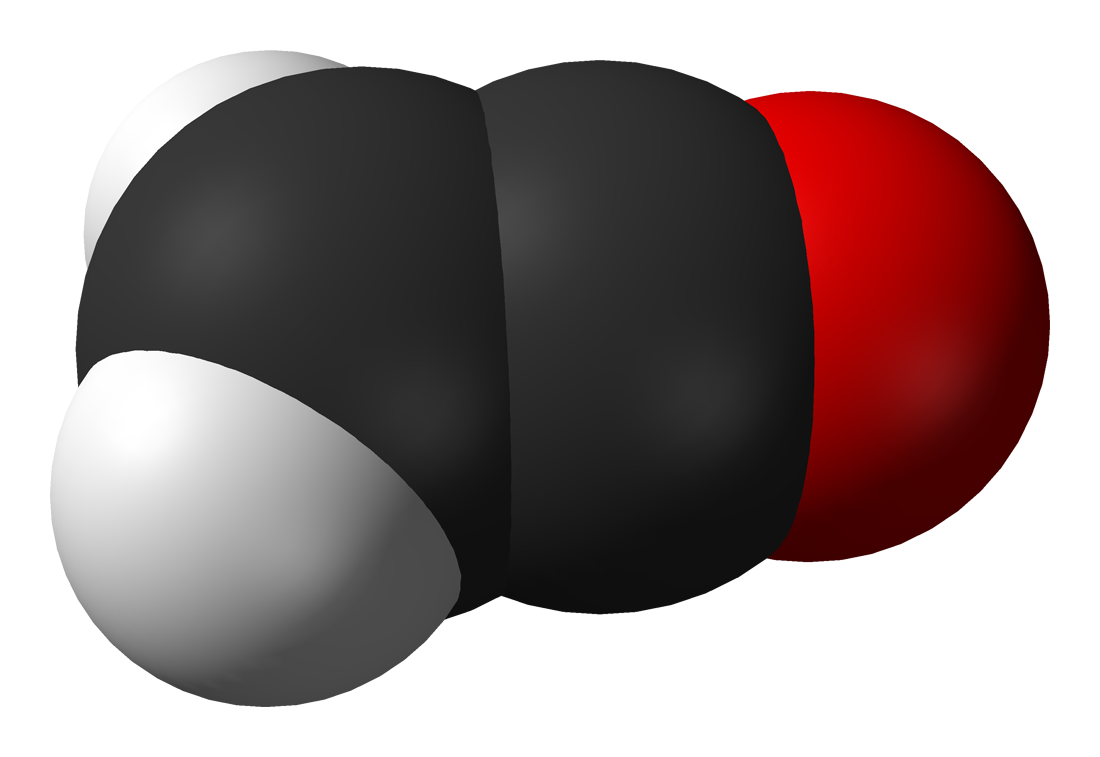
- Space-filling model

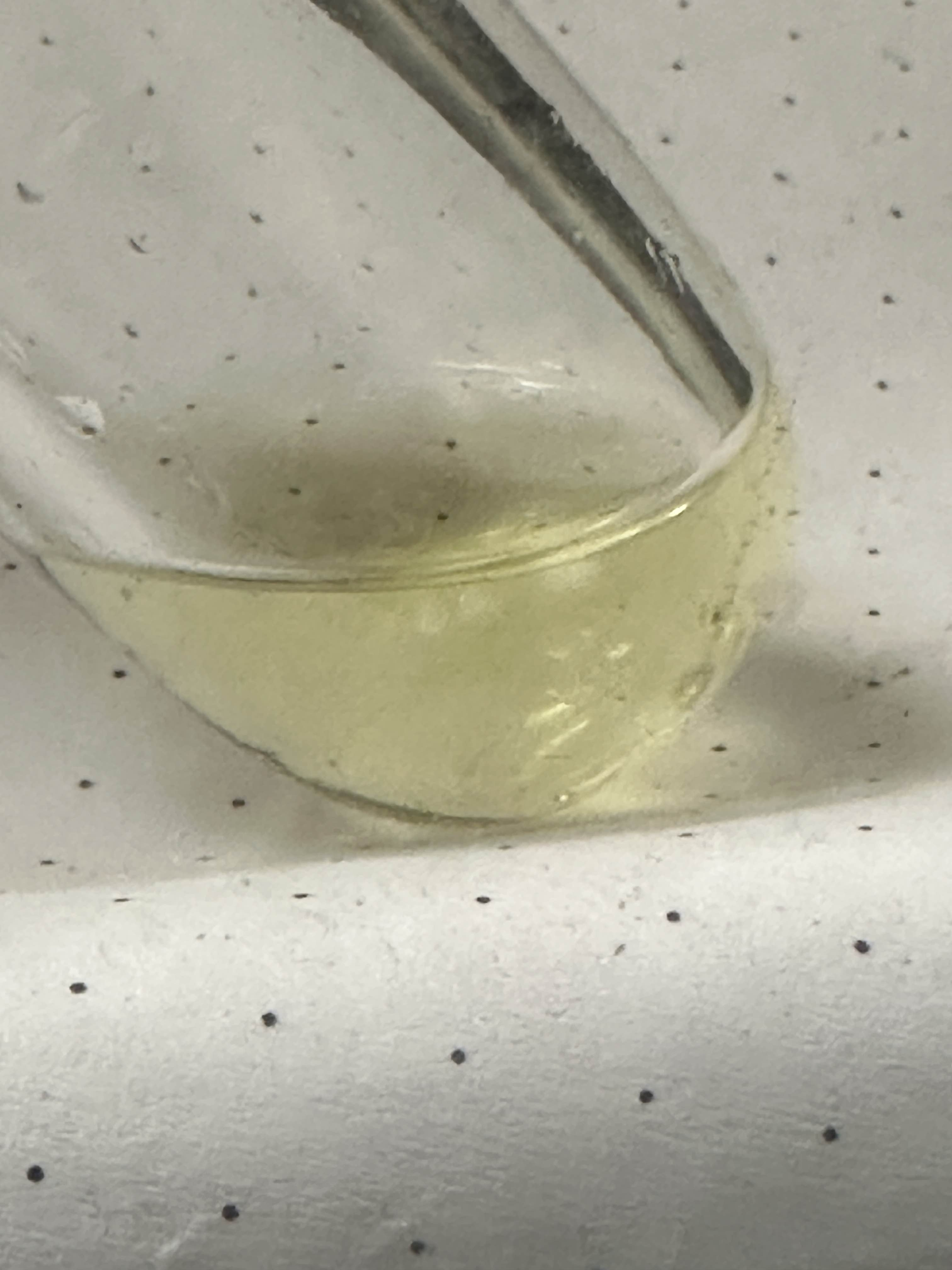

Names
- Preferred IUPAC name Ethenone
- Other names: Ketene; Carbomethene; Keto-ethylene

Identifiers
| CAS Number | 463-51-4 |
| 3D model (JSmol) | Interactive image |
| Beilstein Reference | 1098282 |
| ChEBI | CHEBI:48003 |
| ChemSpider | 9643 |
| ECHA InfoCard | 100.006.671 |
| EC Number | 207-336-9 |
| PubChem CID | 10038 |
| RTECS number | OA7700000 |
| UNII | LEP3SM032A |
| CompTox Dashboard (EPA) | DTXSID1052113 |
- InChI: InChI=1S/C2H2O/c1-2-3/h1H2 Key: CCGKOQOJPYTBIH-UHFFFAOYSA-N; InChI=1/C2H2O/c1-2-3/h1H2 Key: CCGKOQOJPYTBIH-UHFFFAOYSA-N; InChI=1/C2H2O/c1-2-3/h1H2 Key: CCGKOQOJPYTBIH-UHFFFAOYAO
- SMILES: O=C=C

Properties
| Chemical formula | C_{2}H_{2}O |
| Molar mass | 42.037 g·mol^{−1} |
| Appearance | Colourless gas |
| Odor | penetrating |
| Density | 1.93 g/cm^{3} |
| Melting point | −151 °C (−240 °F; 122 K) |
| Boiling point | −49.7 °C (−57.5 °F; 223.5 K) |
| Solubility in water | decomposes |
| Solubility | Soluble in acetone and diethyl ether |
| Vapor pressure | 1 atm (100 kPa) (−50 °C (−58 °F)) |
| Refractive index (n_{D}) | 1.4355 |
| Dipole moment | 1.422 |

Thermochemistry
| Heat capacity (C) | 51.8 J⋅mol^{−1}·K^{-1} |
| Std molar entropy (S^{⦵}_{298}) | 247.6 J⋅mol^{−1}·K^{-1} |
| Std enthalpy of formation (Δ_{f}H^{⦵}_{298}) | −47.5 kJ⋅mol^{−1} |
| Gibbs free energy (Δ_{f}G^{⦵}) | −48.3 kJ⋅mol^{−1} |
| Std enthalpy of combustion (Δ_{c}H^{⦵}_{298}) | 1025 kJ⋅mol^{−1} |

Hazards
- GHS labelling
| Pictograms | (GHS02: Flammable) (GHS05: Corrosive) (GHS06: Toxic) (GHS07: Exclamation mark) |
| Signal word | Danger |
| Hazard statements | H220, H315, H318, H330, H335 |
| Precautionary statements | P203, P210, P222, P260, P264, P264+P265, P271, P280, P284, P302+P352, P304+P340, P305+P354+P338, P316, P317, P319, P320, P321, P332+P317, P362+P364, P377, P381, P403, P403+P233, P405, P501 |
| NFPA 704 (fire diamond) | 4 4 1 |
| Flash point | −107 °C (−161 °F; 166 K) |
| Explosive limits | 5.5%–18% |
| Threshold limit value (TLV) | 0.5 ppm (TWA), 1.5 ppm (STEL) |
- Lethal dose or concentration (LD, LC)
| LD_{50} (median dose) | 1300 mg/kg (oral, rat) |
| LC_{50} (median concentration) | 17 ppm (mouse, 10 min) |
| LC_{Lo} (lowest published) | 23 ppm (mouse, 30 min); 53 ppm (rabbit, 2 hr); 53 ppm (guinea pig, 2 hr); 750 ppm (cat, 10 min); 200 ppm (monkey, 10 min); 1000 ppm (rabbit, 10 min) |
- NIOSH (US health exposure limits)
| PEL (Permissible) | TWA 0.5 ppm (0.9 mg/m^{3}) |
| REL (Recommended) | TWA 0.5 ppm (0.9 mg/m^{3}); ST 1.5 ppm (3 mg/m^{3}) |
| IDLH (Immediate danger) | 5 ppm |
| Safety data sheet (SDS) | External MSDS |
- Except where otherwise noted, data are given for materials in their standard state (at 25 °C [77 °F], 100 kPa). verify (what is ?) Infobox references

Ethenone is the formal name for ketene, an organic compound with formula C_{2}H_{2}O or H_{2}C=C=O. It is the simplest member of the ketene class. It is an important reagent for acetylations.

== Properties ==
Ethenone is a highly reactive gas (at standard conditions) and has a sharp, irritating odour. It is reasonably stable only at low temperatures (−80 °C (−112 °F)). It must therefore always be prepared for each use and processed immediately, otherwise a dimerization to diketene occurs, or polymers are formed that are difficult to handle. Its polymerization can be reduced by adding sulfur dioxide. Because of its cumulative double bonds, it adds readily to H-acidic compounds, reacting with water, for example, to form acetic acid, and with primary or secondary amines to yield the corresponding acetamides.

== Preparation ==
Ethenone is produced by thermal dehydration of acetic acid at 700–750 °C (1,292–1,382 °F) in the presence of triethyl phosphate as a catalyst:

CH_{3}CO_{2}H → CH_{2}=C=O + H_{2}O

It has also been produced on a laboratory scale by the thermolysis of acetone at 600–700 °C (1,112–1,292 °F).

CH_{3}COCH_{3} → CH_{2}=C=O + CH_{4}

This reaction is called the Schmidlin ketene synthesis.

On a laboratory scale it can be produced by the thermal decomposition of Meldrum's acid at temperatures greater than 200 °C (392 °F).

=== History ===
Ethenone was first produced in 1907 by N. T. M. Wilsmore through pyrolysis of acetone or acetic anhydride vapours over a hot platinum wire in an apparatus that was later developed by Charles D. Hurd into the "Hurd lamp" or "ketene lamp". This apparatus consists of a heated flask of acetone producing vapours which are pyrolyzed by a metal filament electrically heated to red heat, with a condenser to return unreacted acetone to the boiling flask. Other heating methods have been used and similar methods were used on a larger scale for the industrial production of ketene for acetic anhydride synthesis.

Ethenone was discovered at the same time by Hermann Staudinger (by reaction of bromoacetyl bromide with metallic zinc) The dehydration of acetic acid was reported in 1910.

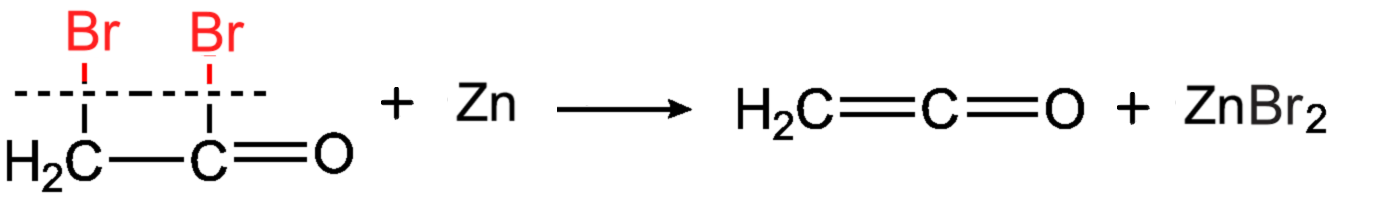

The thermal decomposition of acetic anhydride was also described.

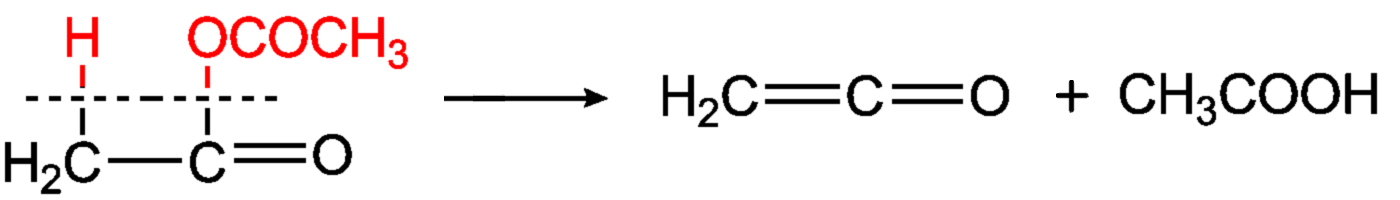

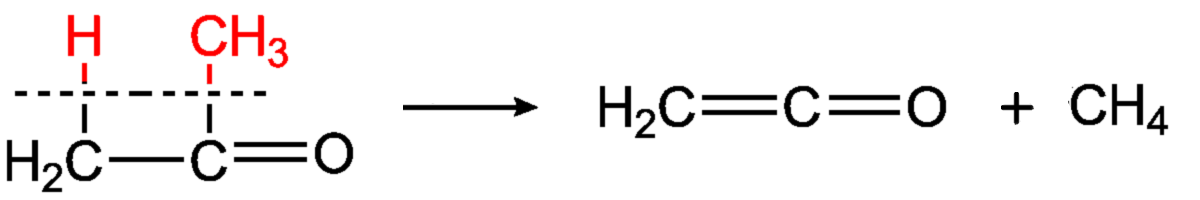

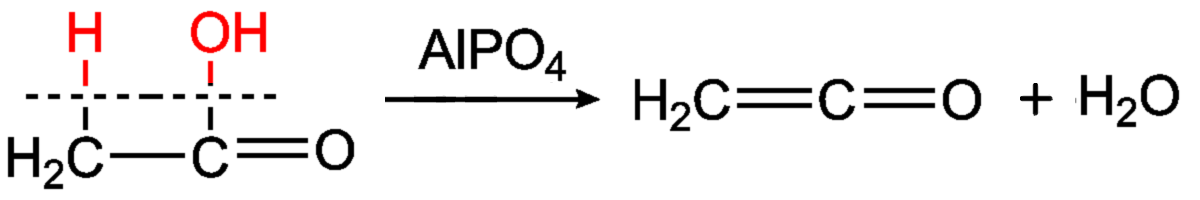

== Natural occurrence ==
Ethenone has been observed to occur in space, in comets or in gas as part of the interstellar medium.

== Use ==
Ethenone is used to make acetic anhydride from acetic acid. Generally it is used for the acetylation of chemical compounds.

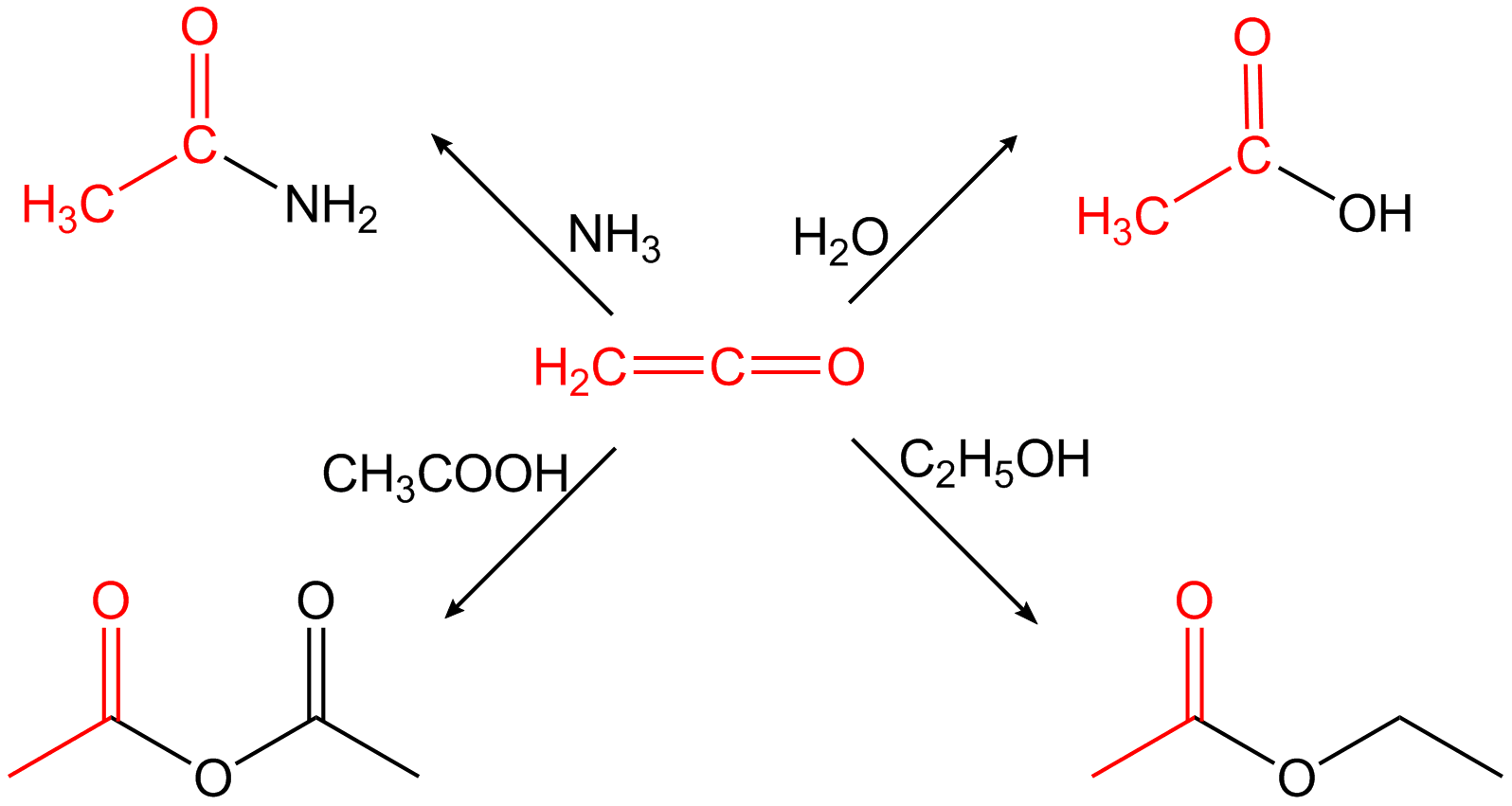
Reactions with ammonia, water, ethanol, and acetic acid

Mechanism of the above reactions

Ethenone reacts with formaldehyde in the presence of catalysts such as Lewis acids (AlCl_{3}, ZnCl_{2} or BF_{3}) to give β-propiolactone. The technically most significant use of ethenone is the synthesis of sorbic acid by reaction with crotonaldehyde in toluene at about 50 °C (122 °F) in the presence of zinc salts of long-chain carboxylic acids. This produces a polyester of 3-hydroxy-4-hexenoic acid, which is thermally or hydrolytically depolymerized to sorbic acid.

Ethenone is very reactive, tending to react with nucleophiles to form an acetyl group. For example, it reacts with water to form acetic acid, with acetic acid to form acetic anhydride, with ammonia and amines to form ethanamides, and with dry hydrogen halides to form acetyl halides.

The formation of acetic acid likely occurs by an initial formation of 1,1-dihydroxyethene, which then tautomerizes to give the final product.

Ethenone will also react with itself via [2 + 2] photocycloadditions to form cyclic dimers known as diketenes. For this reason, it should not be stored for long periods.

Ketene cycloadditions can be difficult to control; dichloroketene is typically used instead, followed by dehalogenation with zinc-copper couple.

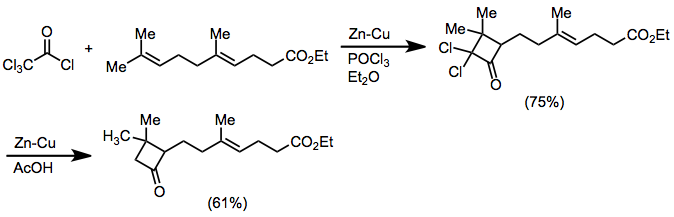

== Hazards ==
Exposure to concentrated levels causes irritation of the eyes, nose, throat and lungs. Extended toxicity testing on mice, rats, guinea pigs and rabbits showed that ten-minute exposures to concentrations of freshly generated ethenone as low as 17 ppm may produce a high percentage of deaths in small animals. These findings show ethenone is toxicologically identical to phosgene.

The formation of ketene in the pyrolysis of vitamin E acetate, an additive of some e-liquid products, is one possible mechanism of the reported pulmonary damage caused by electronic cigarette use. A number of patents describe the catalytic formation of ketene from carboxylic acids and acetates, using a variety of metals or ceramics, some of which are known to occur in e-cigarette devices from patients with e-cigarette or vaping product-use associated lung injury (EVALI).

Occupational exposure limits are set at 0.5 ppm (0.9 mg/m^{3}) over an eight-hour time-weighted average. An IDLH limit is set at 5 ppm, as this is the lowest concentration productive of a clinically relevant physiologic response in humans.
