= Ketene =

Organic compound of the form >C=C=O

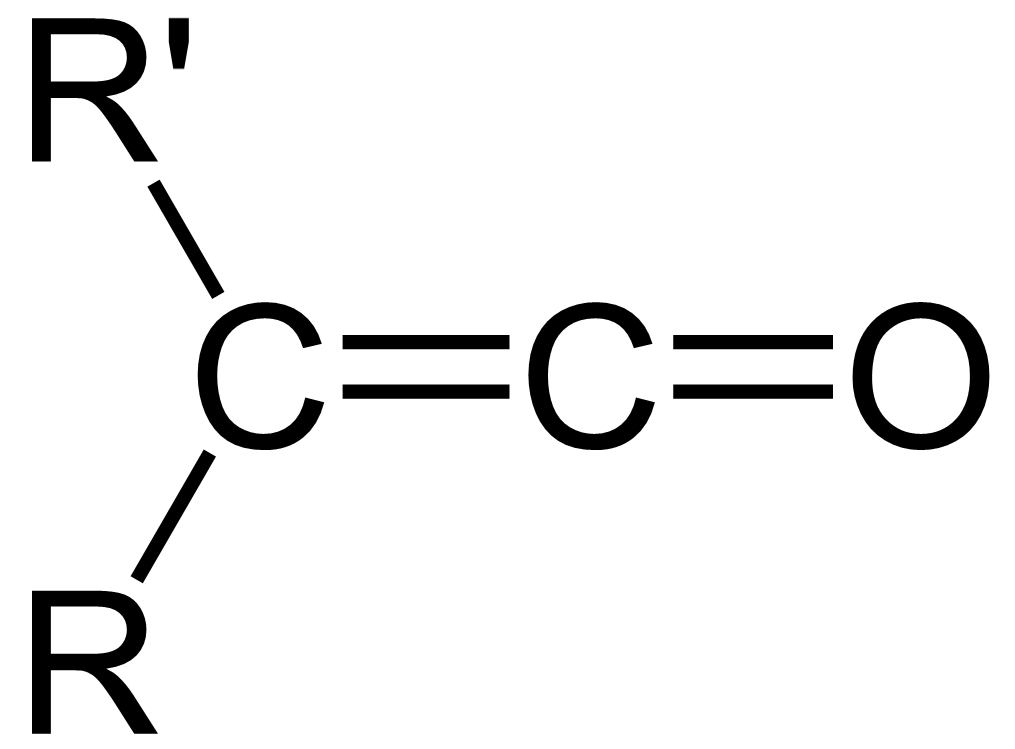
General formula for a ketene

In organic chemistry, a ketene is an organic compound of the form RR'C=C=O, where R and R' are two arbitrary monovalent chemical groups (or two separate substitution sites in the same molecule). The name may also refer to the specific compound ethenone H_{2}C=C=O, the simplest ketene.

Although they are highly useful, most ketenes are unstable. When used as reagents in a chemical procedure, they are typically generated when needed, and consumed as soon as (or while) they are produced.

== History ==
Ketenes were first studied as a class by Hermann Staudinger before 1905.

Ketenes were systematically investigated by Hermann Staudinger in 1905 in the form of diphenylketene (conversion of $\alpha$-chlorodiphenyl acetyl chloride with zinc). Staudinger was inspired by the first examples of reactive organic intermediates and stable radicals discovered by Moses Gomberg in 1900 (compounds with triphenylmethyl group).

== Properties ==
Ketenes are highly electrophilic at the carbon atom bonded with the heteroatom, due to its sp character. Ketenes can be formed with different heteroatoms bonded to the sp carbon atom, such as O, S or Se, respectively called ketenes, thioketenes and selenoketenes.

Ethenone, the simplest ketene, has different experimental lengths for each of its double bonds; the C=O bond is 1.160 Å and the C=C bond is 1.314 Å. The angle between the two H atoms is 121.5°, similar to the theoretically ideal angle in alkenes between sp^{2} carbon atoms and H substituents.

Ketenes are unstable and cannot be stored. Absent nucleophiles with which to react, they dimerise (see § Reactions).

== Synthesis ==
Ketenes are principally synthesized through elimination reactions.

The parent, ethenone, is produced commercially by thermal dehydration of acetic acid. Likewise carbodiimides dehydrate enol-conjugated acids (e.g. cyanoacetates).

Other ketenes can be prepared from acyl chlorides: a base, usually triethylamine, removes an acidic proton alpha to the carbonyl group, inducing the formation of the carbon-carbon double bond and the loss of a chloride ion:

Chlorides can be replaced by other leaving groups; for example, flash vacuum thermolysis decomposes 2-pyridylamides to pyridylamine and the ketene.

Non-elimination ketene syntheses rely on rearrangement or forming the acyl moiety in situ. In the Wolff rearrangement, an α-diazoketone releases nitrogen and undergoes an alkyl shift to a ketene. Likewise, irradiating vinylene thionocarbonate releases carbonyl sulfide and a keto-carbene, which undergoes a similar rearrangement.

Formally, ketenes are the carbonylation product of transition metal carbene complexes, and several metal complexes catalyze the substitution of carbon monoxide for nitrogen in diazo compounds. The proposed mechanisms vary: in the case of a cobalt(II)-porphyrin complex, the initial step is an oxidative alkylation to a cobalt(III)-carbene radical complex, which carbon monoxide then reduces.

Ethenone can be produced through pyrolysis of acetone vapours over a hot filament in an apparatus that was eventually developed into the "ketene lamp" or "Hurd lamp" (named for Charles D. Hurd).

== Reactions ==
Due to their cumulated double bonds, ketenes are very reactive. The free energy released in their saturation can power the formation of relatively strained rings.

=== Acylation ===
Ketenes are strong acylating agents. They react with carboxylic acids to form carboxylic acid anhydrides...

...with alcohols to form carboxylic acid esters...

...with amines to give amides...

...with water to give carboxylic acids...

...and with enolisable carbonyl compounds to give enol esters. For example, ethenone reacts with acetone to form a propen-2-yl acetate:

=== Cycloadditions ===
As first observed in 1908, ketenes react with virtually any electron-rich π bond to form 4-membered rings. For example, in the Staudinger synthesis, a ketene attacks an imine to form a β-lactam:

Ketenes also cyclize onto enolic and enaminic alkenes, carbodiimides, and electron-rich alkynes (the latter forming cyclobutenones). cis Alkenes react more easily than trans alkenes. Electron-withdrawing substituents on the ketene accelerate the reaction, but disubstituted ketenes react slowly due to steric hindrance.

Ketenes attack ketones and aldehydes to give β-lactones, but only under Lewis acid catalysis or when the carbonyl is electron-impoverished:

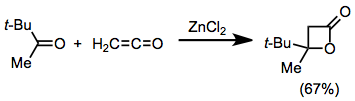

Dienes generally react as two separate alkenes, and fulvenes typically react in the ring, leaving the exocyclic double bond intact:

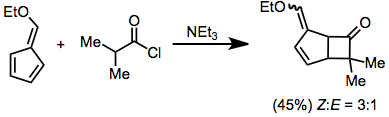

==== Stereochemistry ====
[2+2] cycloadditions proceed by a concerted, thermal mechanism, which requires suprafacial- antarafacial alignment. Ketenes, unlike most alkenes, can align antarafacially with respect to other alkenes. The unique transition state geometry has the interesting consequence that the bulkier substituent on the ketene will tend to end up on the more sterically hindered face of the cyclobutanone ring. In the transition state for cyclization, the small substituent points toward the alkene.

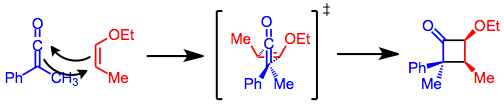

Ketenes place the larger substituent in the endo position when attacking cyclic alkenes.

The use of chiral amine catalysts has allowed access to cycloaddition products in high enantiomeric excess.

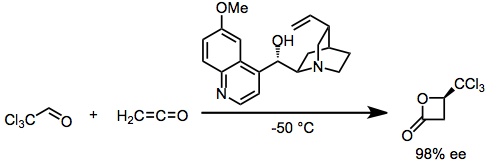

==== Higher-length cycloadditions ====
In rarer cases, ketenes may undergo [3+2], and [4+2] cycloadditions.

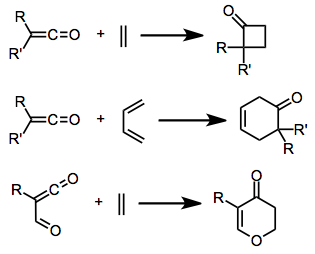

[3+2] Cycloadditions may take place with 1,3-dipoles. This process appears to be concerted, but either ketenic double-bond can react.

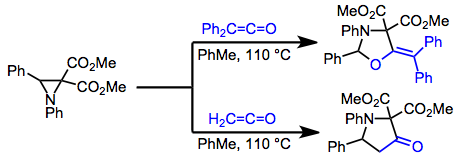

Michael acceptors often react in a [4+2] fashion:

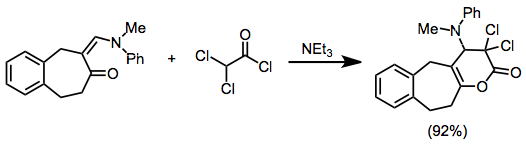

Conjugated ketenes may act as 4π partners in [4+2] cycloadditions as well. Examples in which a vinylketene serves as the 4π partner are rare, but occur with some ketene-conjugated heterodienes:

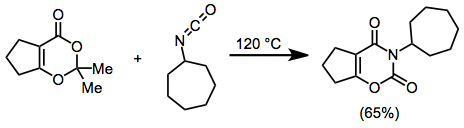

=== Dimerization ===
Ketenes autodimerize to give various products. The parent reacts acylates itself to form diketene, a β-lactone, whereas disubstituted ketenes undergo [2+2] cycloaddition to a substituted cyclobutadione:

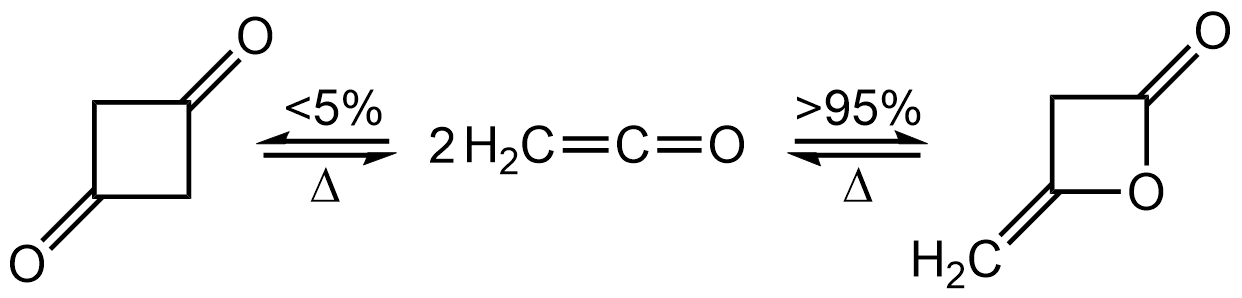

Monosubstituted ketenes can afford either the ester or diketone dimer.

Although many polar solvents and catalysts accelerate many reactions using ketene, such reactions are normally performed in nonpolar media to prevent dimerization.

== Applications ==
Dimerization of stearic ketene affords alkyl ketene dimers, widely used in the paper industry. AKD's react with the hydroxyl groups on the cellulose via esterification reaction.

Likewise, diols (HO−R−OH) and bis-ketenes (O=C=CH−R'−CH=C=O) react to yield polyesters with a repeat unit of (−O−R−O−CO−R'−CO).

The Staudinger synthesis is used to synthesize β-lactam antibiotics.

Ethyl acetoacetate, an organic synthesis feedstock, is prepared industrially from diketene in ethanol.

== See also ==
- Ynol
- Thioketene
- Ketenimine
- Heterocumulene
