= Cyclobutenone =

Names
- IUPAC name Cyclobut-2-en-1-one
- Other names 2-Cyclobutene-1-one

Identifiers
CAS Number	32264-87-2
3D model (JSmol)	Interactive image
ChemSpider	125004
EC Number	32264-87-2
MeSH	cyclobutenone
PubChem CID	141691
CompTox Dashboard (EPA)	DTXSID60186016
- InChI: InChI=1S/C4H4O/c5-4-2-1-3-4/h1-2H,3H2 Key: DFLRGCFWSRELEL-UHFFFAOYSA-N
- SMILES: C1C=CC1=O

Properties
Chemical formula	C_{4}H_{4}O
Molar mass	68.075 g·mol^{−1}

Hazards
- GHS labelling
Pictograms	(GHS07: Exclamation mark)
Signal word	Warning
Hazard statements	H302, H315, H319, H335
Precautionary statements	P280, P305+P351+P338
Safety data sheet (SDS)	A2B Chem
- Except where otherwise noted, data are given for materials in their standard state (at 25 °C [77 °F], 100 kPa). Infobox references

Cyclobutenone is a chemical compound with the formula C_{4}H_{4}O. It is a highly strained cyclic enone which exhibits significant chemical reactivity. Notable reactions of cyclobutenone include acting as a Michael acceptor, a dienophile for Diels-Alder reactions, and a regioselective substrate for activation of C−C bonds. Electrocyclic ring opening of cyclobutenones yields vinylketenes, which serve as reactive intermediates in cycloaddition reactions.

== Preparation ==
Unsubstituted cyclobutenone can be prepared by dehydrohalogenation of 3-bromocyclobutanone. The bromocyclobutanone precursor can be prepared by decarboxylation of 3-oxocyclobutanecarboxylic acid with bromine and mercury(II) oxide.

Substituted cyclobutenones can be prepared by cycloaddition of an alkyne and ketene, such as the [2+2] cycloaddition of 1-hexyne and dichloroketene (generated in situ from trichloroacetyl chloride) to 3‑butyl‑4,4‑dichlorocyclobutenone.

== Reactivity ==
Cyclobutenone has been described as an "unusually reactive" dienophile, substantially more reactive than other enone rings like cyclopentenone and cyclohexenone.
