= Wharton reaction =

Chemical reaction

The Wharton olefin synthesis or the Wharton reaction is a chemical reaction that involves the reduction of α,β-epoxy ketones using hydrazine to give allylic alcohols. This reaction, introduced in 1961 by P. S. Wharton, is an extension of the Wolff–Kishner reduction. The general features of this synthesis are: 1) the epoxidation of α,β-unsaturated ketones is achieved usually in basic conditions using hydrogen peroxide solution in high yield; 2) the epoxy ketone is treated with 2–3 equivalents of a hydrazine hydrate in presence of substoichiometric amounts of acetic acid. This reaction occurs rapidly at room temperature with the evolution of nitrogen and the formation of an allylic alcohol. It can be used to synthesize carenol compounds. Wharton's initial procedure has been improved.

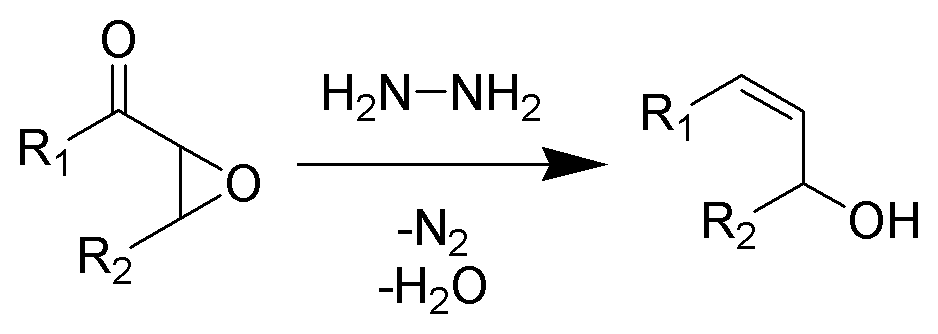
The Wharton reaction

== Mechanism and scope ==
The mechanism of the Wharton reaction begins with reaction of the ketone (1) with hydrazine to form a hydrazone (2). Rearrangement of the hydrazone gives intermediate 3, which can decompose giving off nitrogen gas forming the desired product 4. The final decomposition can proceed by an ionic or a radical pathway, depending on reaction temperature, solvent used, and structure of intermediate 3.

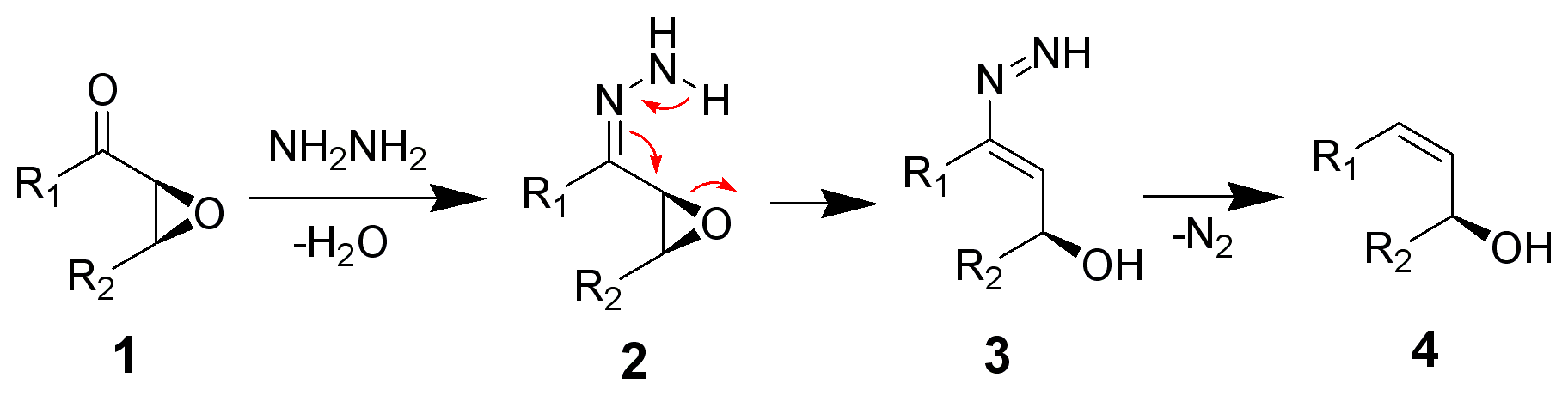
The mechanism of the Wharton reaction

The Wharton olefin synthesis allows the transformation of an α,β unsaturated ketone into an allylic alcohol. The epoxide starting material can be generated by a number of methods, with the most common being reaction of the corresponding alkene with hydrogen peroxide or m-chloroperoxybenzoic acid. The Wharton reaction also commonly suffers from reduction of the allylic alcohol product down to the aliphatic alcohol. This is thought to be due to the oxidation of hydrazine to diimide under the conditions employed in the reaction. The classical Wharton olefin synthesis has two limitations:

- The classical Wharton olefin synthesis conditions are not free from the presence of water, so reactants undergoing the Wharton olefin synthesis should not be sensitive to water.
- For acyclic α,β-unsaturated ketones, the Wharton olefin synthesis does not show any selectivity for a specific configuration of the newly synthesized double bond, in terms of (E) or (Z)-stereoisomers.

== Applications ==
The methodology has been implemented in synthesis of complex molecules:

- The total synthesis of the anticancer natural product OSW-1 provides a practical application of the Wharton olefin synthesis. An α,β-epoxyketone reacts with hydrazine hydrate to yield an allylic alcohol.
- In the synthesis of warburganal, a bioactive natural product, the α,β-epoxyketone is formed from a cyclic α,β-unsaturated ketone and in a separate step reacts under the classical Wharton olefin synthesis conditions to yield an allylic diol.

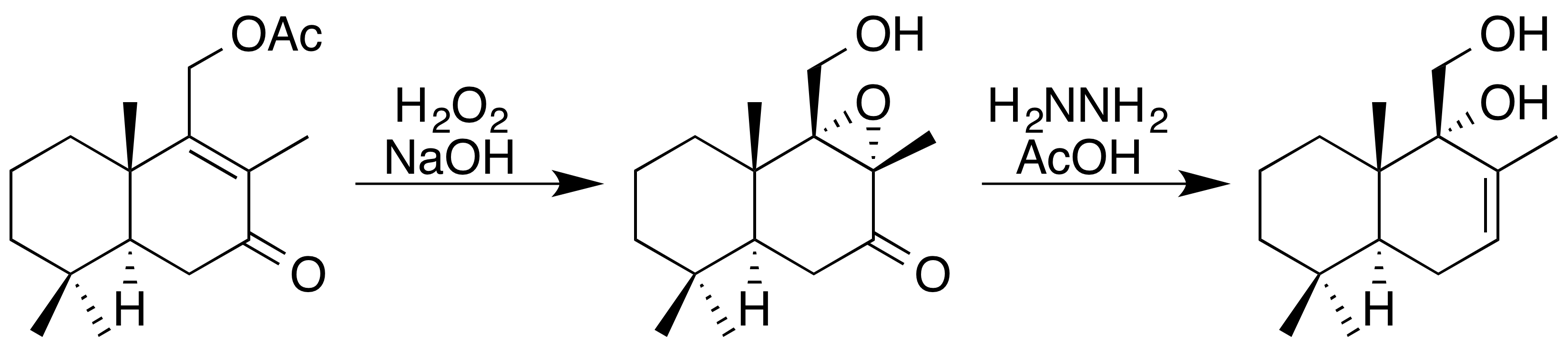

== See also ==
- Eschenmoser fragmentation
- Grob fragmentation
- Wolff–Kishner reduction
