= Wolff–Kishner reduction =

Reduction method involving hydrazine

Wolff-Kischner reduction
Named after	Ludwig Wolff; Nikolai Kischner
Reaction type	Organic redox reaction

Identifiers
Organic Chemistry Portal	wolff-kishner-reduction
RSC ontology ID	RXNO:0000226

The Wolff–Kishner reduction is a reaction used in organic chemistry to convert carbonyl functionalities into methylene groups. In the context of complex molecule synthesis, it is most frequently employed to remove a carbonyl group after it has served its synthetic purpose of activating an intermediate in a preceding step. As such, there is no obvious retron for this reaction. The reaction was reported by Nikolai Kischner in 1911 and Ludwig Wolff in 1912.

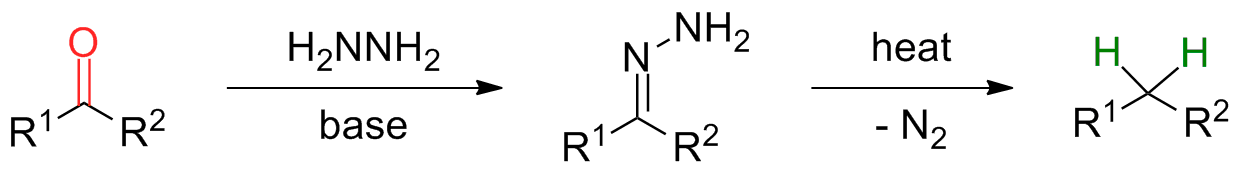
Scheme 1. Wolff-Kishner Reduction

In general, the reaction mechanism first involves the in situ generation of a hydrazone by condensation of hydrazine with the ketone or aldehyde substrate. Sometimes it is however advantageous to use a pre-formed hydrazone as substrate (see modifications). The rate determining step of the reaction is de-protonation of the hydrazone by an alkoxide base to form a diimide anion by a concerted, solvent mediated protonation/de-protonation step. Collapse of this alkyldiimide with loss of N_{2} leads to formation of an alkylanion which can be protonated by solvent to give the desired product.

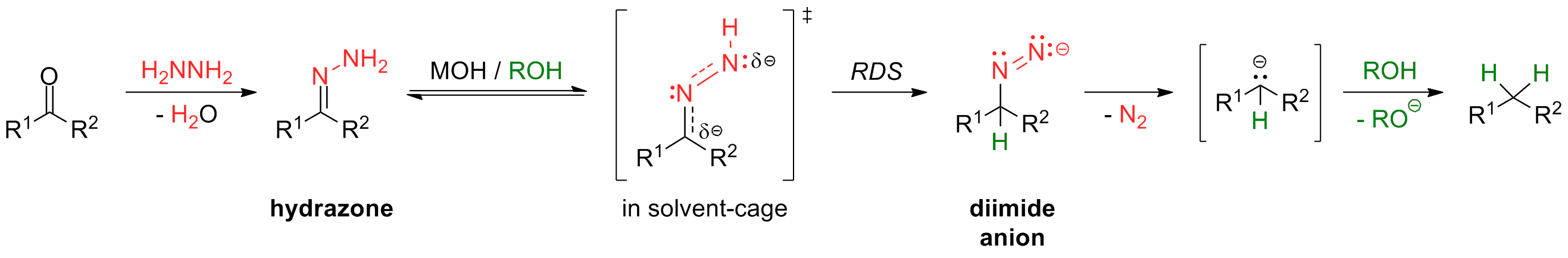
Scheme 1-1. Summary of mechanism of Wolff-Kishner reaction

Because the Wolff–Kishner reduction requires highly basic conditions, it is unsuitable for base-sensitive substrates. In some cases, formation of the required hydrazone will not occur at sterically hindered carbonyl groups, preventing the reaction. However, this method can be superior to the related Clemmensen reduction for compounds containing acid-sensitive functional groups such as pyrroles and for high-molecular weight compounds.

== History ==
The Wolff–Kishner reduction was discovered independently by N. Kishner in 1911 and Ludwig Wolff in 1912. Kishner found that addition of pre-formed hydrazone to hot potassium hydroxide containing crushed platinized porous plate led to formation of the corresponding hydrocarbon.

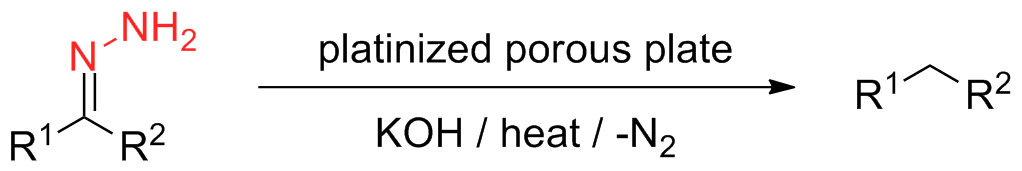
Scheme 2. Kishner's conditions

Wolff later accomplished the same result by heating an ethanol solution of semicarbazones or hydrazones in a sealed tube to 180 °C in the presence of sodium ethoxide.

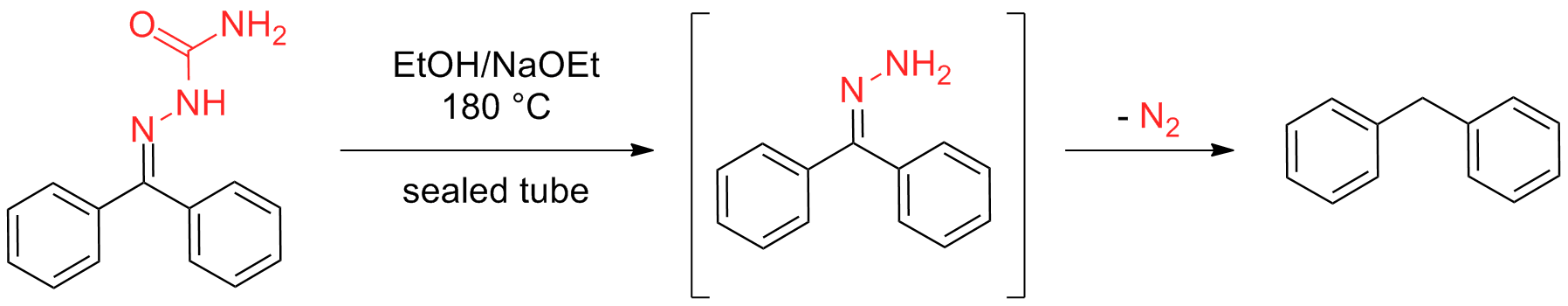
Scheme 3. Wolff's conditions

The method developed by Kishner has the advantage of avoiding the requirement of a sealed tube, but both methodologies suffered from unreliability when applied to many hindered substrates. These disadvantages promoted the development of Wolff’s procedure, wherein the use of high-boiling solvents such as ethylene glycol and triethylene glycol were implemented to allow for the high temperatures required for the reaction while avoiding the need of a sealed tube. These initial modifications were followed by many other improvements as described below.

== Mechanism ==
The mechanism of the Wolff–Kishner reduction has been studied by Szmant and coworkers. According to Szmant's research, the first step in this reaction is the formation of a hydrazone anion 1 by deprotonation of the terminal nitrogen by MOH. If semicarbazones are used as substrates, initial conversion into the corresponding hydrazone is followed by deprotonation. A range of mechanistic data suggests that the rate-determining step involves formation of a new carbon–hydrogen bond at the carbon terminal in the delocalized hydrazone anion. This proton capture takes place in a concerted fashion with a solvent-induced abstraction of the second proton at the nitrogen terminal. Szmant’s finding that this reaction is first order in both hydroxide ion and ketone hydrazone supports this mechanistic proposal. Several molecules of solvent have to be involved in this process in order to allow for a concerted process. A detailed Hammett analysis of aryl aldehydes, methyl aryl ketones and diaryl ketones showed a non-linear relationship which the authors attribute to the complexity of the rate-determining step. Mildly electron-withdrawing substituents favor carbon-hydrogen bond formation, but highly electron-withdrawing substituents will decrease the negative charge at the terminal nitrogen and in turn favor a bigger and harder solvation shell that will render breaking of the N-H bond more difficult. The exceptionally high negative entropy of activation values observed can be explained by the high degree of organization in the proposed transition state.

It was furthermore found that the rate of the reaction depends on the concentration of the hydroxylic solvent and on the cation in the alkoxide catalyst. The presence of crown ether in the reaction medium can increase the reactivity of the hydrazone anion 1 by dissociating the ion pair and therefore enhance the reaction rate. The final step of the Wolff–Kishner reduction is the collapse of the dimide anion 2 in the presence of a proton source to give the hydrocarbon via loss of dinitrogen to afford an alkyl anion 3, which undergoes rapid and irreversible acid-base reaction with solvent to give the alkane. Evidence for this high-energy intermediate was obtained by Taber via intramolecular trapping. The stereochemical outcome of this experiment was more consistent with an alkyl anion intermediate than the alternative possibility of an alkyl radical. The overall driving force of the reaction is the evolution of nitrogen gas from the reaction mixture.

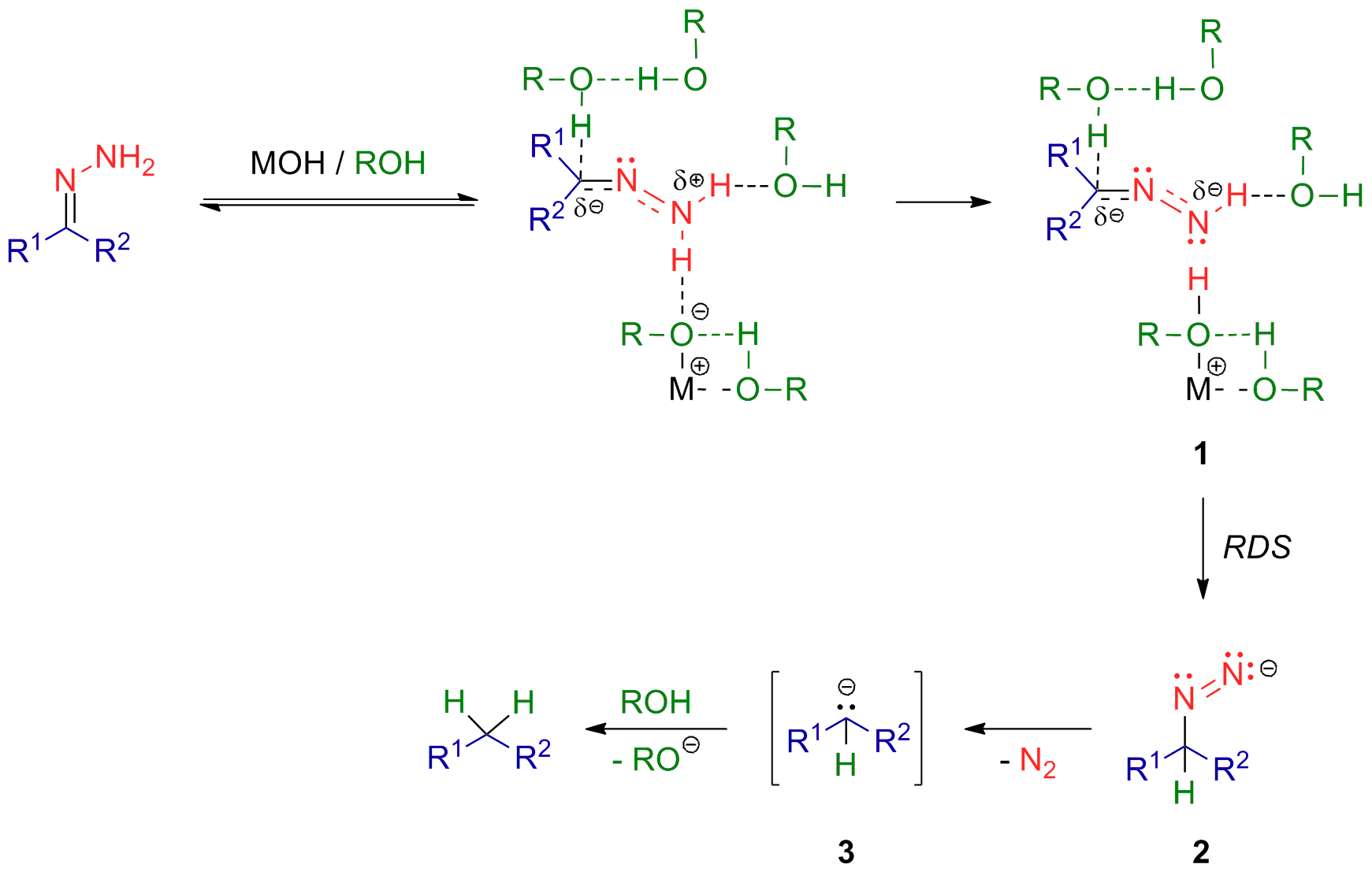
Scheme 4. Mechanism of the Wolff-Kishner reduction

== Modifications ==
Many of the efforts devoted to improve the Wolff–Kishner reduction have focused on more efficient formation of the hydrazone intermediate by removal of water and a faster rate of hydrazone decomposition by increasing the reaction temperature. Some of the newer modifications provide more significant advances and allow for reactions under considerably milder conditions. The table shows a summary of some of the modifications that have been developed since the initial discovery.

	Original procedure	Huang Minlon	Barton	Cram	Henbest	Caglioti	Myers
Reagents	carbonyl compound, 100% H_{2}NNH_{2}, Na or NaOEt	carbonyl compound, 85% H_{2}NNH_{2}, KOH	carbonyl compound, anhydrous H_{2}NNH_{2}, Na	preformed hydrazone, KOtBu	preformed hydrazone, KOtBu	tosylhydrazone, hydride donor	carbonyl compound, 1,2-bis(tert-butyldimethylsilyl)- hydrazine, Sc(OTf)_{3}, KOtBu
Solvent	high-boiling solvent, e.g. ethylene glycol	high-boiling solvent, e.g. ethylene glycol	high-boiling solvent, e.g. diethylene glycol	anh. DMSO	toluene	THF	DMSO
Temperature	200 °C	180–200 °C (after removal of water and excess hydrazine)	210 °C	25 °C	111 °C	66 °C	25 °C
Advantages	single step procedure	reduced reaction times, higher temperatures can be reached, no need to use anh. hydrazine	allows decarbonylation of sterically hindered substrates	proceeds at room temperature	no slow addition of hydrazone necessary	mild reaction conditions, possible with a variety of reducing agents	very mild reaction conditions
Disadvantages	long reaction times (50–100 h)	distillation necessary	harsh reaction conditions	isolation of hydrazone and slow addition necessary	isolation of hydrazone necessary	isolation of tosylhydrazone necessary. hydride donor may act as base	synthesis of 1,2-bis(tert-butyldimethylsilyl)- hydrazine necessary
Functional group tolerance	does not tolerate esters, amides, halogens, cyano-, and nitro-groups	similar to original procedure	similar to original procedure	tolerates amides	higher tolerance of α-substituents that would undergo elimination and α,β-unsaturated enones that would undergo migration under original conditions	tolerates esters, amides, cyano-, nitro- and chloro-substituents with NaBH_{3}CN as hydride source, does not tolerate primary bromo- and iodo-substituents	not reported

=== Huang Minlon modification ===
In 1946, Huang Minlon reported a modified procedure for the Wolff–Kishner reduction of ketones in which excess hydrazine and water were removed by distillation after hydrazone formation. The temperature-lowering effect of water that was produced in hydrazone formation usually resulted in long reaction times and harsh reaction conditions even if anhydrous hydrazine was used in the formation of the hydrazone. The modified procedure consists of refluxing the carbonyl compound in 85% hydrazine hydrate with three equivalents of sodium hydroxide followed by distillation of water and excess hydrazine and elevation of the temperature to 200 °C. Significantly reduced reaction times and improved yields can be obtained using this modification. Minlon's original report described the reduction of β-(p-phenoxybenzoyl)propionic acid to γ-(p-phenoxyphenyl)butyric acid in 95% yield compared to 48% yield obtained by the traditional procedure.

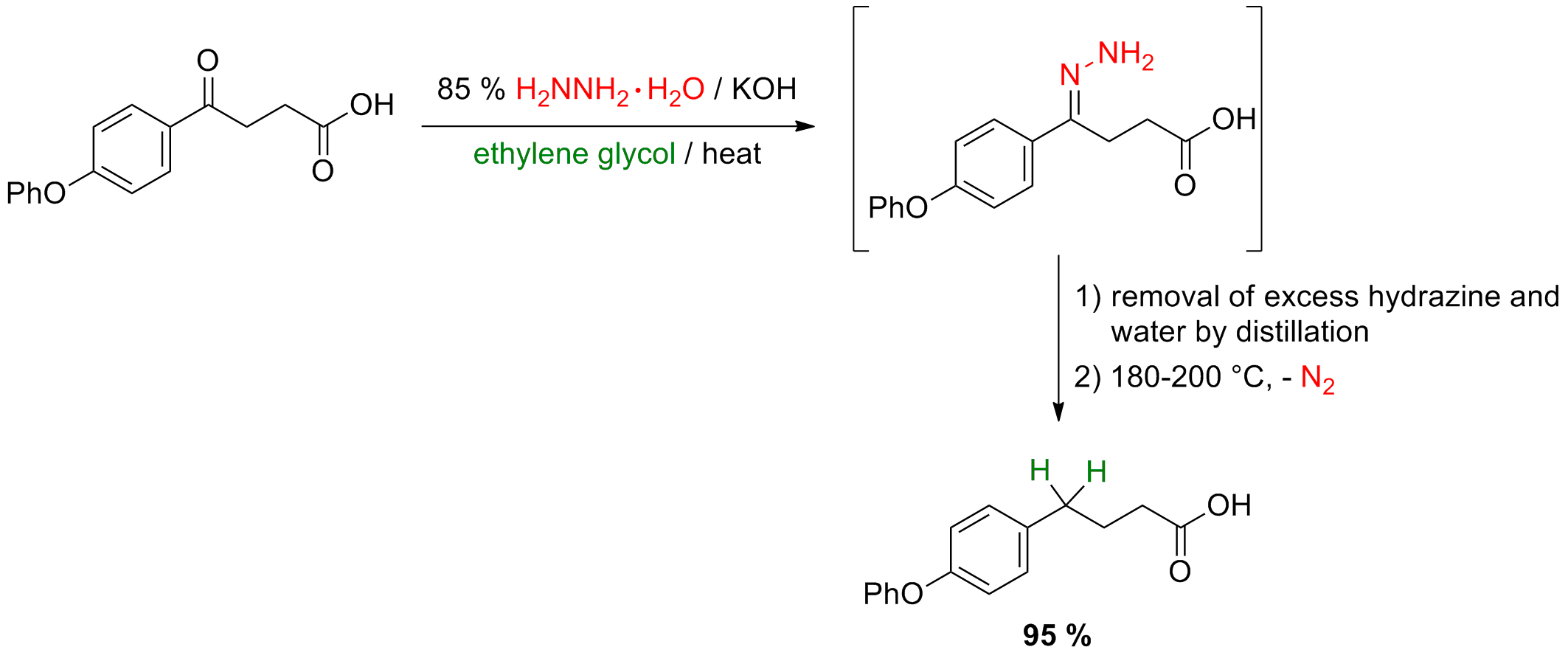
Scheme 5. Huang Minlon modification

=== Barton modification ===
Nine years after Huang Minlon’s first modification, Barton developed a method for the reduction of sterically hindered carbonyl groups. This method features rigorous exclusion of water, higher temperatures, and longer reaction times as well as sodium in diethylene glycol instead of alkoxide base. Under these conditions, some of the problems that normally arise with hindered ketones can be alleviated—for example, the C_{11}-carbonyl group in the steroidal compound shown below was successfully reduced under Barton’s conditions while Huang–Minlon conditions failed to effect this transformation.

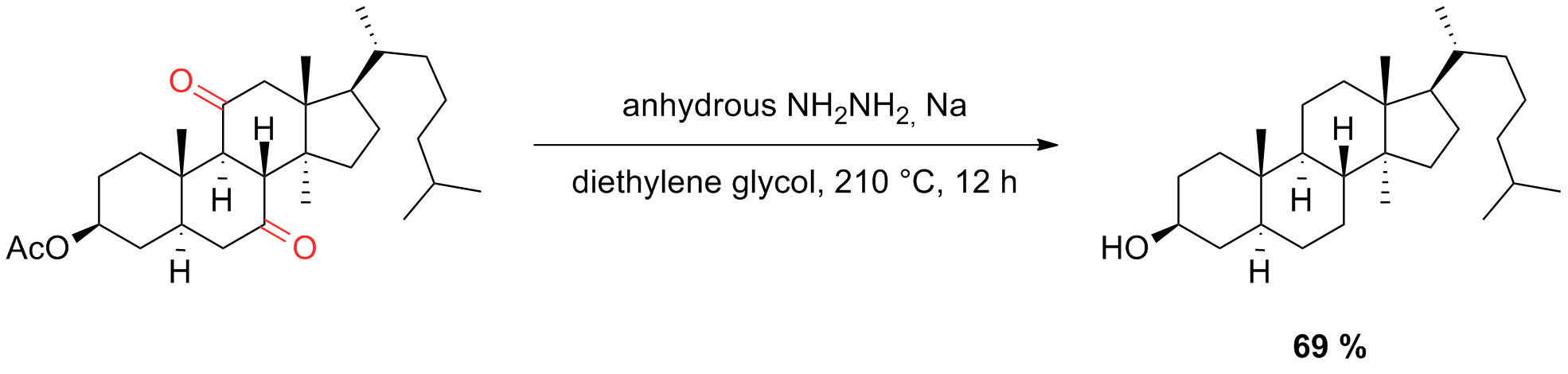
Scheme 6. Barton modification

=== Cram modification ===
Slow addition of preformed hydrazones to potassium tert-butoxide in DMSO as reaction medium instead of glycols allows hydrocarbon formation to be conducted successfully at temperatures as low as 23 °C. Cram attributed the higher reactivity in DMSO as solvent to higher base strength of potassium tert-butoxide in this medium.

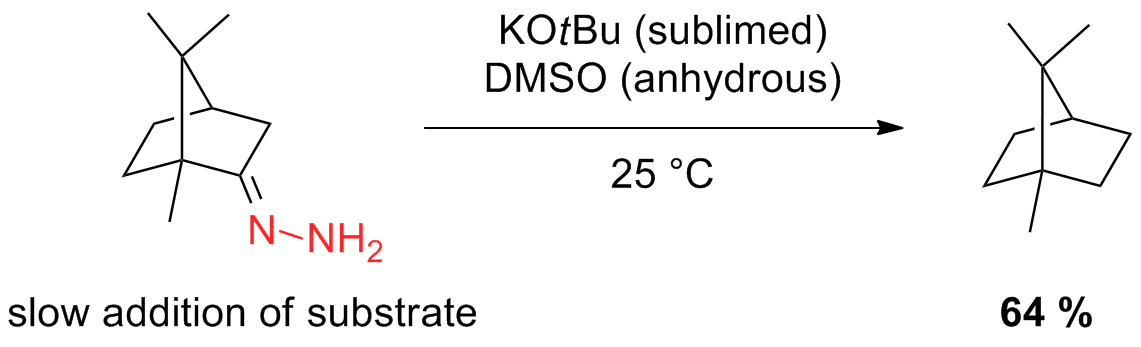
Scheme 7. Cram modification

This modification has not been exploited to great extent in organic synthesis due to the necessity to isolate preformed hydrazone substrates and to add the hydrazone over several hours to the reaction mixture.

=== Henbest modification ===
Henbest extended Cram’s procedure by refluxing carbonyl hydrazones and potassium tert-butoxide in dry toluene. Slow addition of the hydrazone is not necessary and it was found that this procedure is better suited for carbonyl compounds prone to base-induced side reactions than Cram's modification. It has for example been found that double bond migration in α,β-unsaturated enones and functional group elimination of certain α-substituted ketones are less likely to occur under Henbest's conditions.

=== Caglioti reaction ===
Treatment of tosylhydrazones with hydride-donor reagents to obtain the corresponding alkanes is known as the Caglioti reaction. The initially reported reaction conditions have been modified and hydride donors such as sodium cyanoborohydride, sodium triacetoxyborohydride, or catecholborane can reduce tosylhydrazones to hydrocarbons. The reaction proceeds under relatively mild conditions and can therefore tolerate a wider array of functional groups than the original procedure. Reductions with sodium cyanoborohydride as reducing agent can be conducted in the presence of esters, amides, cyano-, nitro- and chloro-substituents. Primary bromo- and iodo-substituents are displaced by nucleophilic hydride under these conditions.

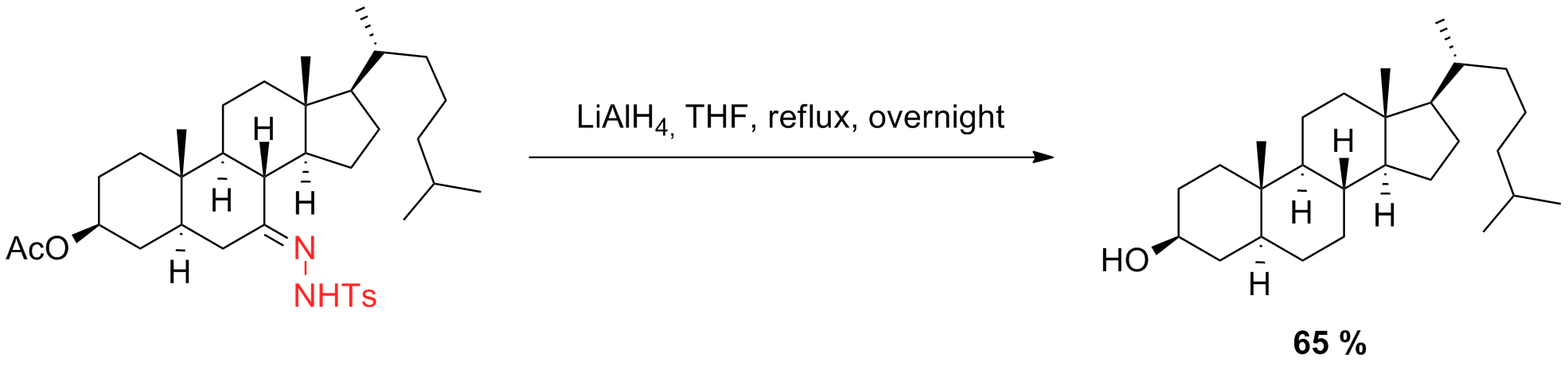
Scheme 8. Caglioti modification

The reduction pathway is sensitive to the pH, the reducing agent, and the substrate. One possibility, occurring under acidic conditions, includes direct hydride attack of iminium ion 1 following prior protonation of the tosylhydrazone. The resulting tosylhydrazine derivative 2 subsequently undergoes elimination of p-toluenesulfinic acid and decomposes via a diimine intermediate 3 to the corresponding hydrocarbon.

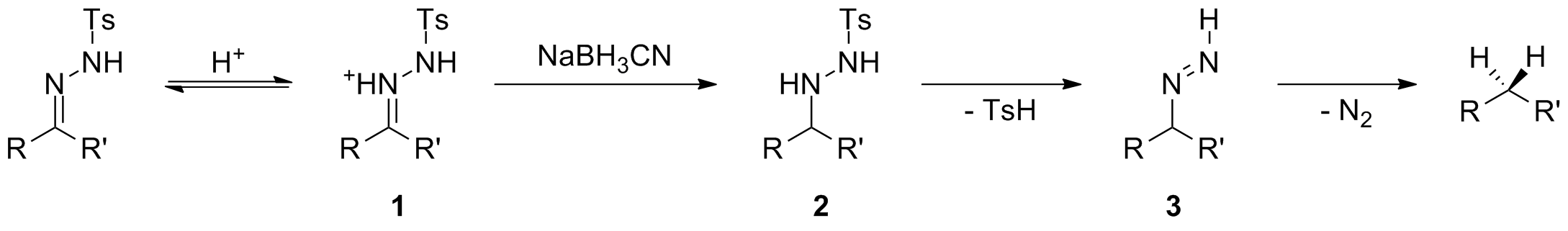
Scheme 9. Mechanistic proposal for the Caglioti reaction

A slight variation of this mechanism occurs when tautomerization to the azohydrazone is facilitated by inductive effects. The transient azohydrazine 4 can then be reduced to the tosylhydrazine derivative 2 and furnish the decarbonylated product analogously to the first possibility. This mechanism operates when relatively weak hydride donors are used, such as sodium cyanoborohydride. It is known that these sodium cyanoborohydride is not strong enough to reduce imines, but can reduce iminium ions.

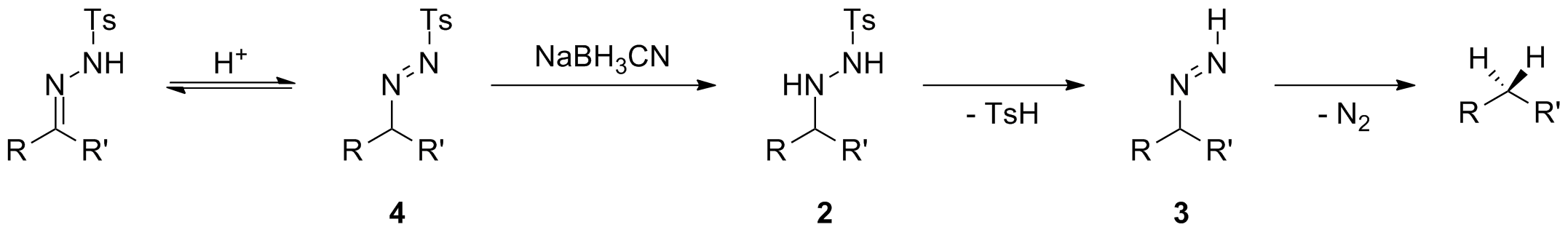
Scheme 10. Alternative mechanistic proposal for the Caglioti reaction

When stronger hydride donors are used, a different mechanism is operational, which avoids the use of acidic conditions. Hydride delivery occurs to give intermediate 5, followed by elimination of the metal sulfinate to give azo intermediate 6. This intermediate then decomposes, with loss of nitrogen gas, to give the reduced compound. When strongly basic hydride donors are used such as lithium aluminium hydride, then deprotonation of the tosyl hydrazone can occur before hydride delivery. Intermediate anion 7 can undergo hydride attack, eliminating a metal sulfinate to give azo anion 8. This readily decomposes to carbanion 9, which is protonated to give the reduced product.

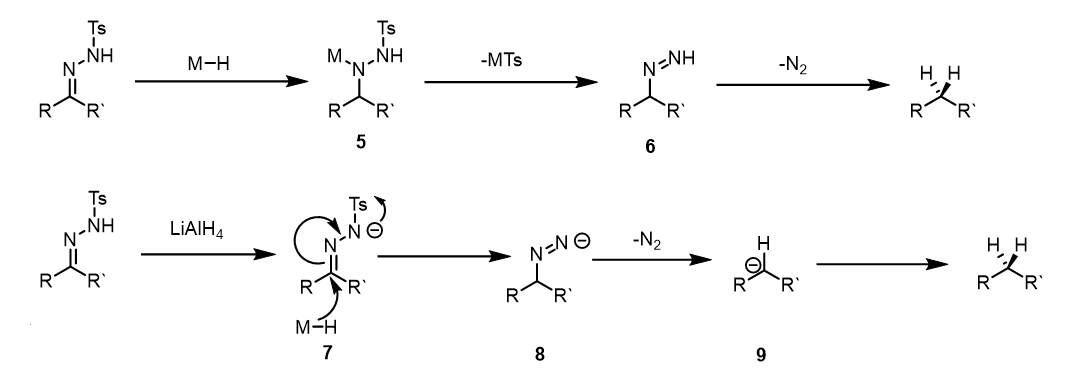
Scheme XX. Caglioti Reaction

As with the parent Wolff–Kishner reduction, the decarbonylation reaction can often fail due to unsuccessful formation of the corresponding tosylhydrazone. This is common for sterically hindered ketones, as was the case for the cyclic amino ketone shown below.

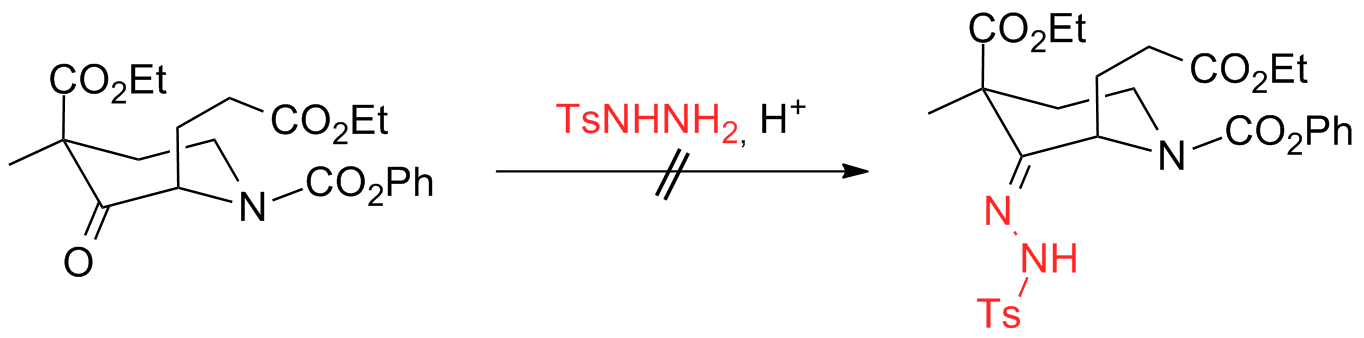
Scheme 11. Unsuccessful substrate in Caglioti reaction

Alternative methods of reduction can be employed when formation of the hydrazone fail, including thioketal reduction with Raney nickel or reaction with sodium triethylborohydride.

=== Deoxygenation of α,β-unsaturated carbonyl compounds ===
α,β-Unsaturated carbonyl tosylhydrazones can be converted into the corresponding alkenes with migration of the double bond. The reduction proceeds stereoselectively to furnish the E geometric isomer.

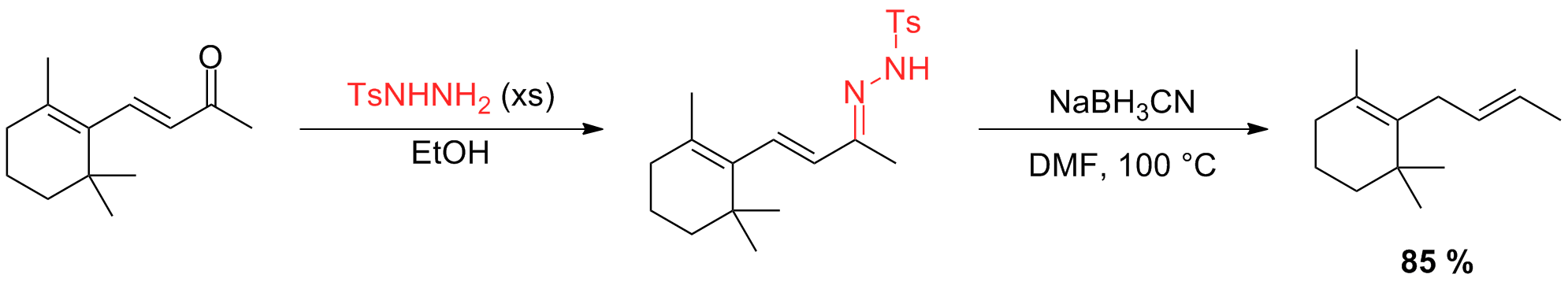
Scheme 12-1. Deoxygenation of an α,β-unsaturated carbonyl compound

A very mild method uses one equivalent of catecholborane to reduce α,β-unsaturated tosylhydrazones.

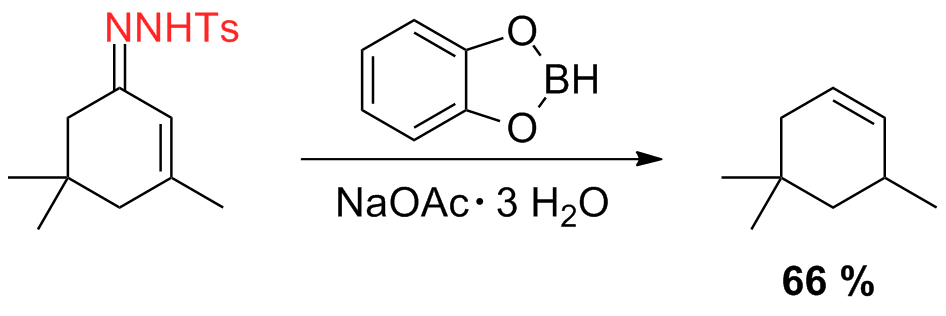
Scheme 12-2. Deoxygenation of an α,β-unsaturated carbonyl compound

The mechanism of NaBH_{3}CN reduction of α,β-unsaturated tosylhydrazones has been examined using deuterium-labeling. Alkene formation is initiated by hydride reduction of the iminium ion followed by double bond migration and nitrogen extrusion which occur in a concerted manner. Allylic diazene rearrangement as the final step in the reductive 1,3-transposition of α,β-unsaturated tosylhydrazones to the reduced alkenes can also be used to establish sp^{3}-stereocenters from allylic diazenes containing prochiral stereocenters. The influence of the alkoxy stereocenter results in diastereoselective reduction of the α,β-unsaturated tosylhydrazone. The authors predicted that diastereoselective transfer of the diazene hydrogen to one face of the prochiral alkene could be enforced during the suprafacial rearrangement.

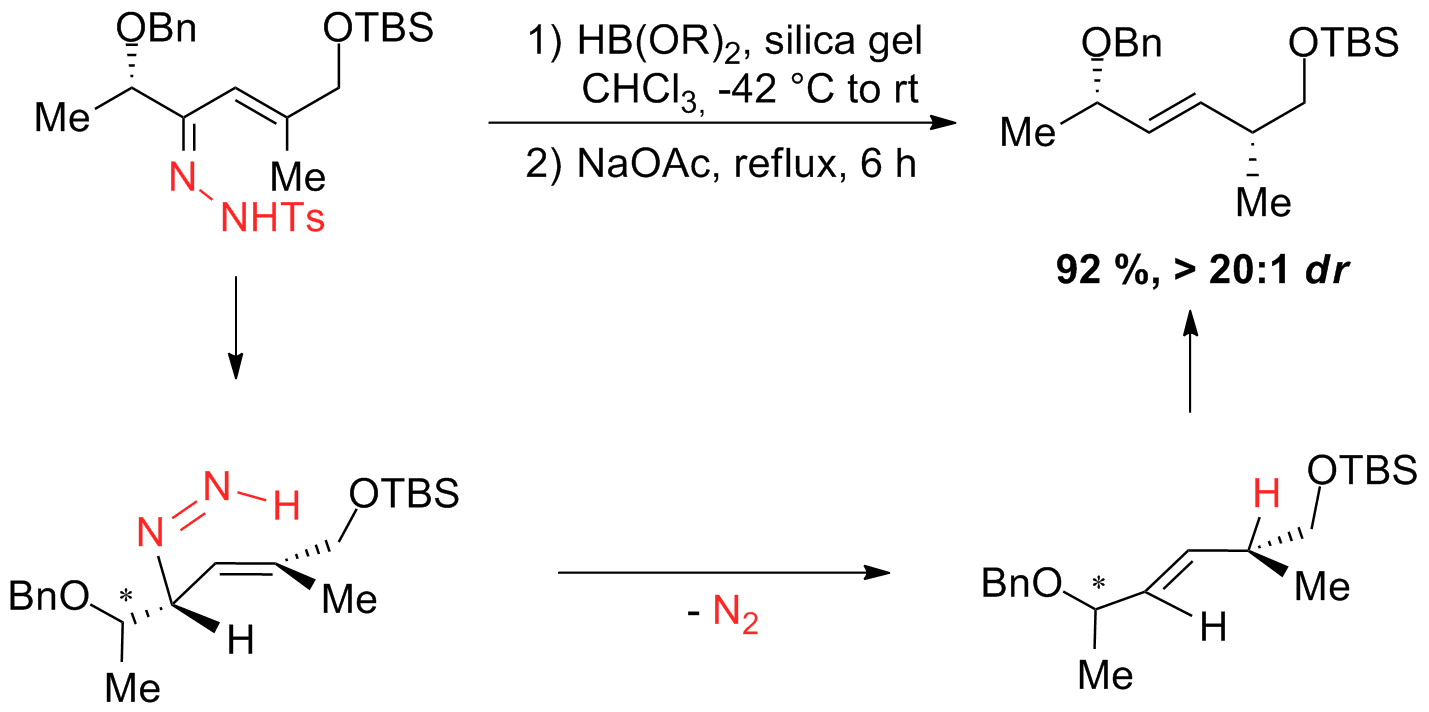
Scheme 13. Mechanism of allylic diazene rearrangement

=== Myers modification ===
In 2004, Myers and coworkers developed a method for the preparation of N-tert-butyldimethylsilylhydrazones from carbonyl-containing compounds. These products can be used as a superior alternative to hydrazones in the transformation of ketones into alkanes. The advantages of this procedure are considerably milder reaction conditions and higher efficiency as well as operational convenience. The condensation of 1,2-bis(tert-butyldimethylsilyl)-hydrazine with aldehydes and ketones with Sc(OTf)_{3} as catalyst is rapid and efficient at ambient temperature. Formation and reduction of N-tert-butyldimethylsilylhydrazones can be conducted in a one pot procedure in high yield.

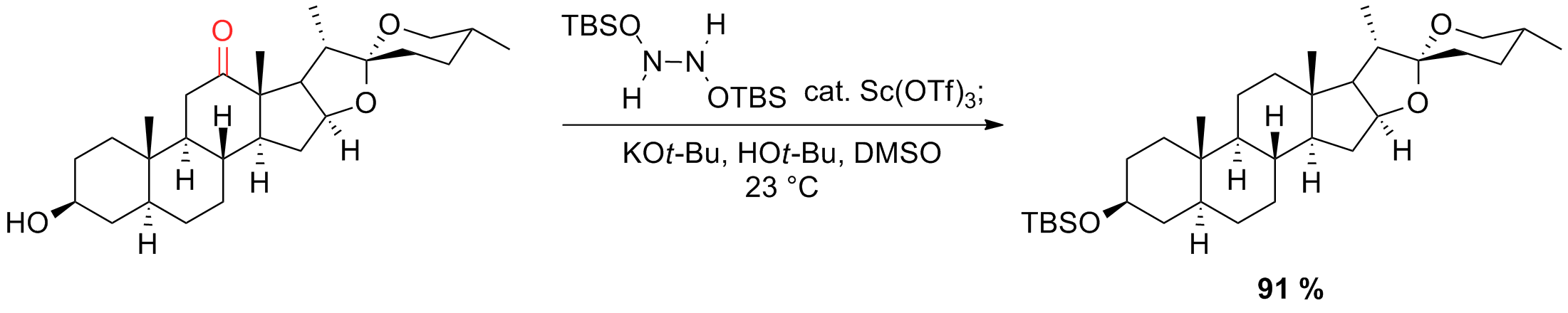
Scheme 14. Myers modification

[This graphic is wrong. It should be TBS-N, not TBSO-N] The newly developed method was compared directly to the standard Huang–Minlon Wolff–Kishner reduction conditions (hydrazine hydrate, potassium hydroxide, diethylene glycol, 195 °C) for the steroidal ketone shown above. The product was obtained in 79% yield compared to 91% obtained from the reduction via an intermediate N-tert-butyldimethylsilylhydrazone.

== Side reactions ==
The Wolff–Kishner reduction is not suitable for base–sensitive substrates and can under certain conditions be hampered by steric hindrance surrounding the carbonyl group. Some of the more common side-reactions are listed below.

=== Azine formation ===
A commonly encountered side-reaction in Wolff–Kishner reductions involves azine formation by reaction of hydrazone with the carbonyl compound. Formation of the ketone can be suppressed by vigorous exclusion of water during the reaction. Several of the presented procedures require isolation of the hydrazone compound prior to reduction. This can be complicated by further transformation of the product hydrazone to the corresponding hydrazine during product purification. Cram found that azine formation is favored by rapid addition of preformed hydrazones to potassium tert-butoxide in anhydrous dimethylsulfoxide.

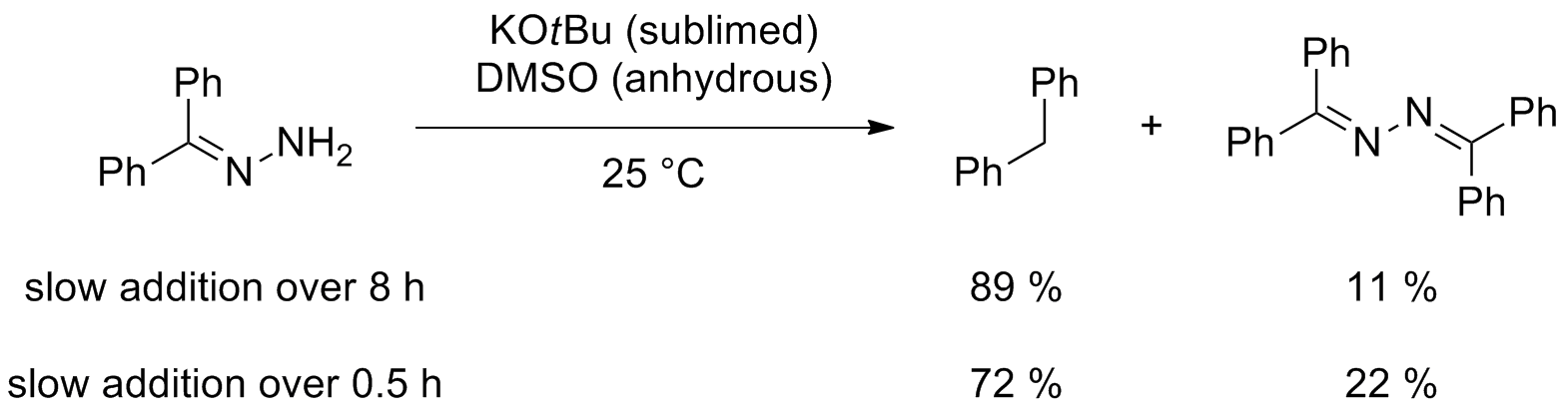
Scheme 15. Azine formation

=== Reduction of ketones to alcohols by sodium ethoxide ===
The second principal side reaction is the reduction of the ketone or aldehyde to the corresponding alcohol. After initial hydrolysis of the hydrazone, the free carbonyl derivative is reduced by alkoxide to the carbinol. In 1924, Eisenlohr reported that substantial amounts of hydroxydecalin were observed during the attempted Wolff–Kishner reduction of trans-β-decalone. In general, alcohol formation may be repressed by exclusion of water or by addition of excess hydrazine.

=== Kishner–Leonard elimination ===
Kishner noted during his initial investigations that in some instances, α-substitution of a carbonyl group can lead to elimination affording unsaturated hydrocarbons under typical reaction conditions. Leonard later further developed this reaction and investigated the influence of different α-substituents on the reaction outcome. He found that the amount of elimination increases with increasing steric bulk of the leaving group. Furthermore, α-dialkylamino-substituted ketones generally gave a mixture of reduction and elimination product whereas less basic leaving groups resulted in exclusive formation of the alkene product.

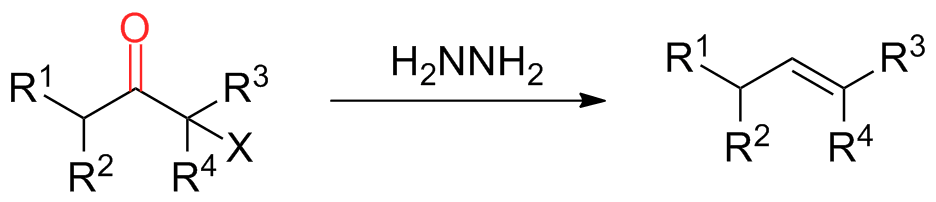
Scheme 16. Kishner-Leonard elimination

The fragmentation of α,β-epoxy ketones to allylic alcohols has been extended to a synthetically useful process and is known as the Wharton reaction.

=== Cleavage or rearrangement of strained rings adjacent to the carbonyl group ===
Grob rearrangement of strained rings adjacent to the carbonyl group has been observed by Erman and coworkers. During an attempted Wolff–Kishner reduction of trans-π-bromocamphor under Cram’s conditions, limonene was isolated as the only product.

Similarly, cleavage of strained rings adjacent to the carbonyl group can occur. When 9β,19-cyclo-5α-pregnane-3,11,20-trione 3,20-diethylene ketal was subjected to Huang–Minlon conditions, ring-enlargement was observed instead of formation of the 11-deoxo-compound.

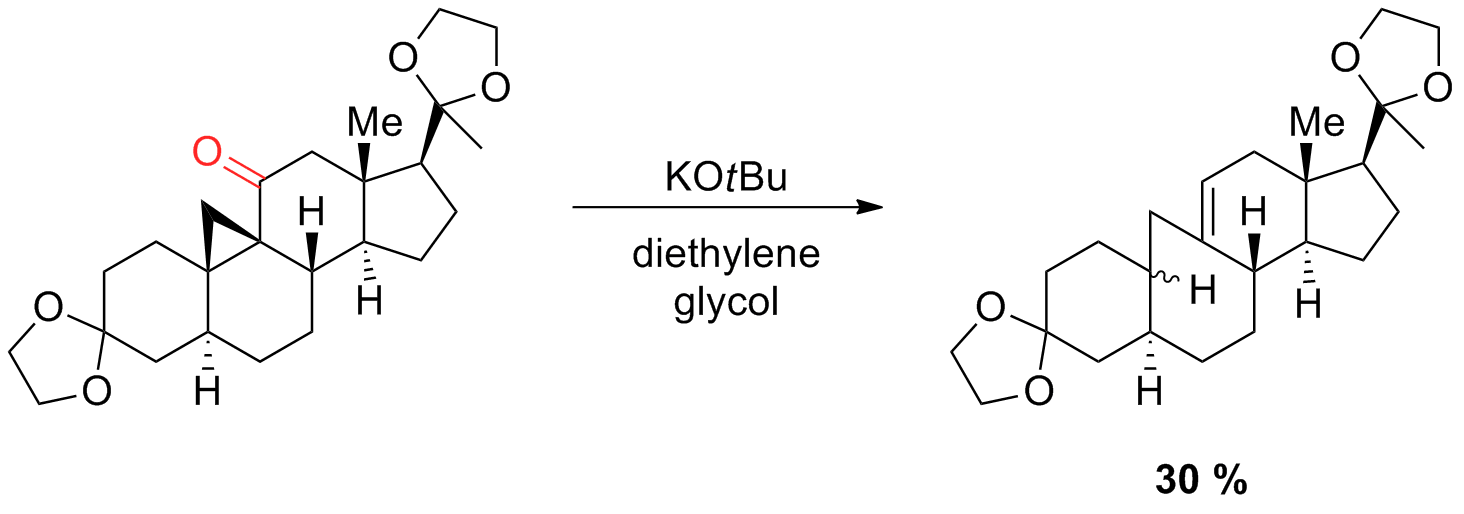
Scheme 17. Ring cleavage during Wolff-Kishner reduction

== Applications in total synthesis ==
The Wolff–Kishner reduction has been applied to the total synthesis of scopadulcic acid B, aspidospermidine and dysidiolide. The Huang Minlon modification of the Wolff–Kishner reduction is one of the final steps in their synthesis of (±)-aspidospermidine. The carbonyl group that was reduced in the Wolff–Kishner reduction was essential for preceding steps in the synthesis. The tertiary amide was stable to the reaction conditions and reduced subsequently by lithium aluminum hydride.

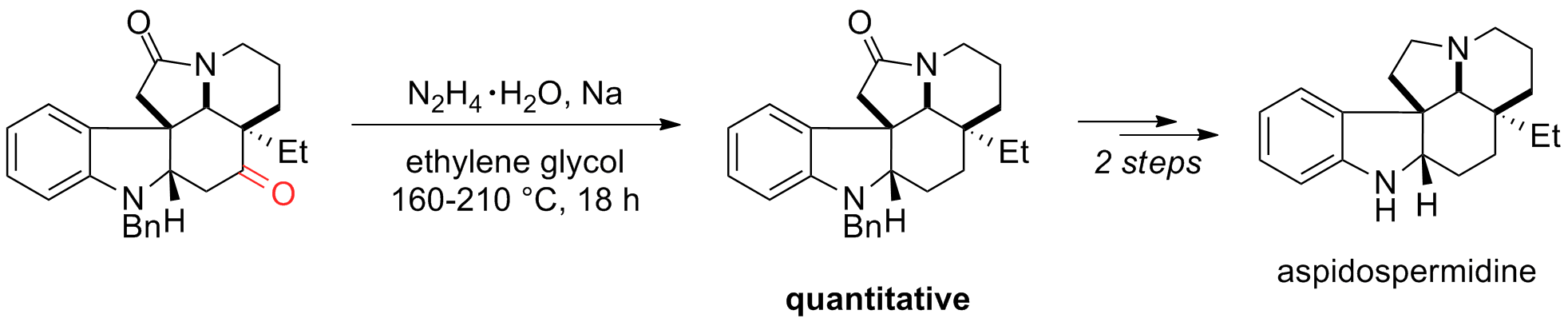
Scheme 18. Synthsesis of Aspidospermidine

Amides are usually not suitable substrates for the Wolff–Kishner reduction as demonstrated by the example above. Coe and coworkers found however that a twisted amide can be efficiently reduced under Wolff–Kishner conditions. The authors explain this observation with the stereoelectronic bias of the substrate which prevents “anti–Bredt” iminium ion formation and therefore favors ejection of alcohol and hydrazone formation. The amide functionality in this strained substrate can be considered as isolated amine and ketone functionalities as resonance stabilization is prevented due to torsional restrictions. The product was obtained in 68% overall yield in a two step procedure.

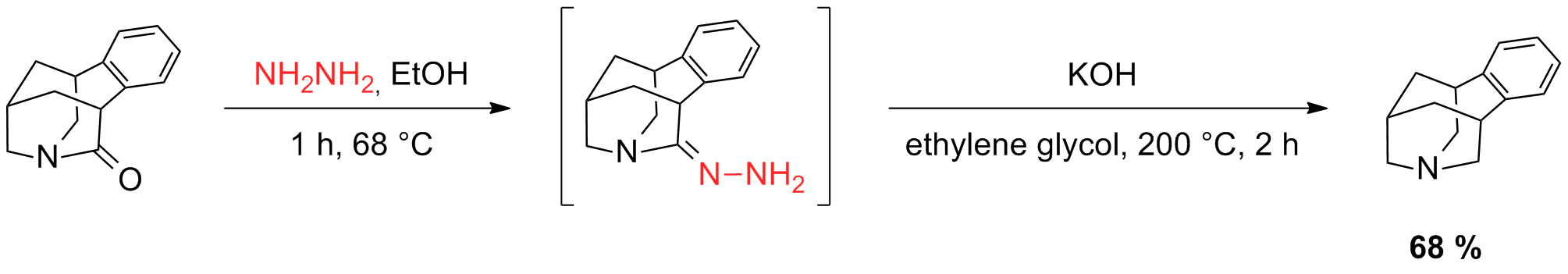
Scheme 19. Reduction of a twisted amide

A tricyclic carbonyl compound was reduced using the Huang Minlon modification of the Wolff–Kishner reduction. Several attempts towards decarbonylation of tricyclic allylic acetate containing ketone failed and the acetate functionality had to be removed to allow Wolff–Kishner reduction. Finally, the allylic alcohol was installed via oxyplumbation.

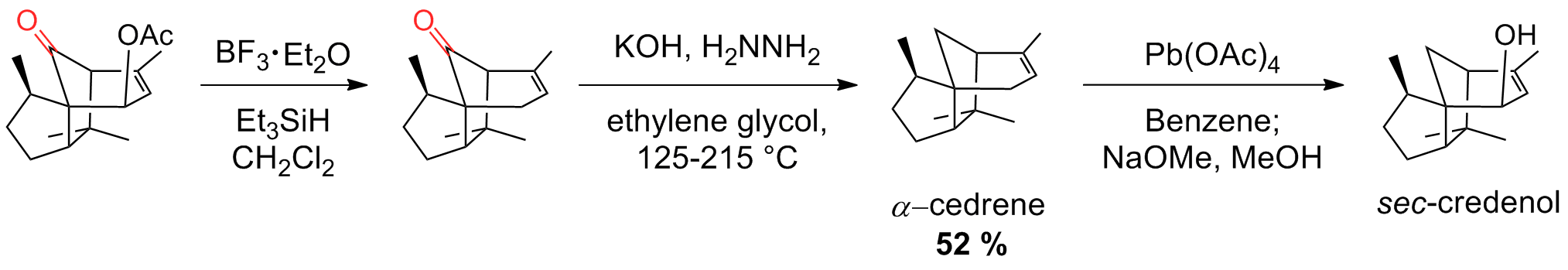
Scheme 20. Synthesis of sec-credenol

The Wolff–Kishner reduction has also been used on kilogram scale for the synthesis of a functionalized imidazole substrate. Several alternative reduction methods were investigated, but all of the tested conditions remained unsuccessful. Safety concerns for a large scale Wolff–Kishner reduction were addressed and a highly optimized procedure afforded to product in good yield.

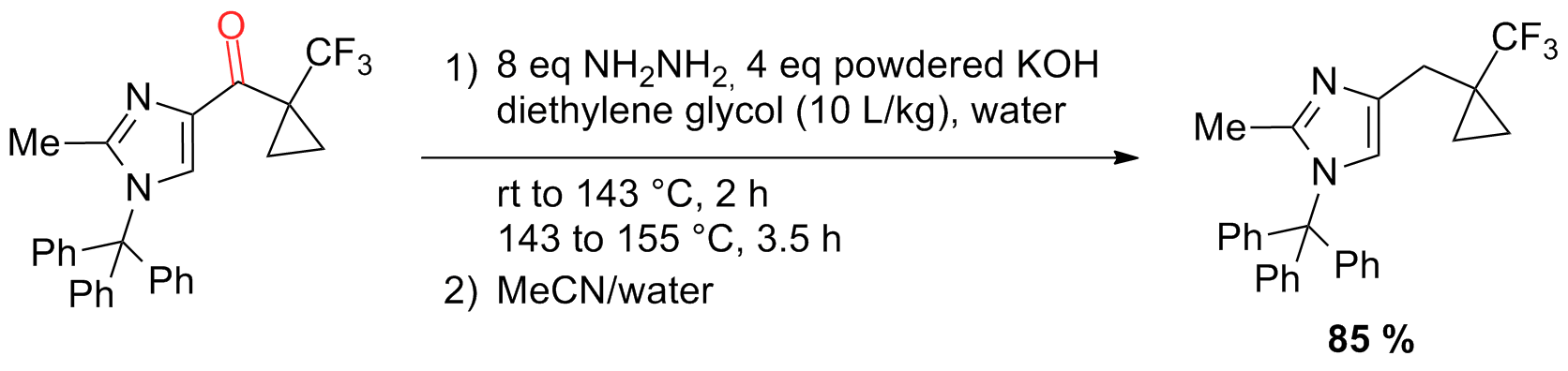
Scheme 21. Large-scale application

An allylic diazene rearrangement was used in the synthesis of the C_{21}–C_{34} fragment of antascomicin B. The hydrazone was reduced selectively with catecholborane and excess reducing agent decomposed with sodium thiosulfate. The crude reaction product was then treated with sodium acetate and to give the 1,4-syn isomer.

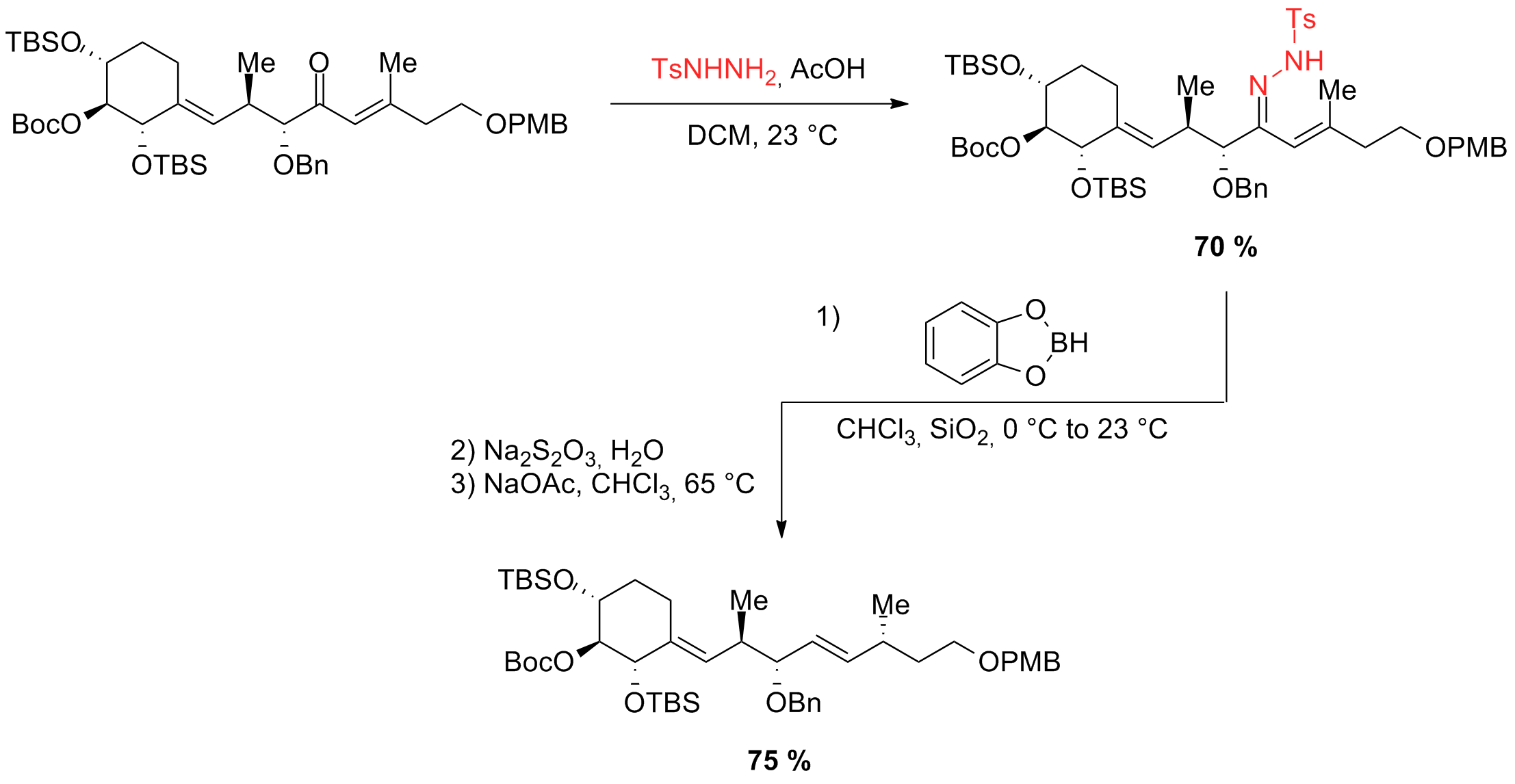
Scheme 22. Allylic diazene rearrangement

== See also ==
- Clemmensen reduction
- Mozingo reduction
- Wharton reaction
- Shapiro reaction
