= Nikolai Kischner =

Russian chemist (1867–1935)

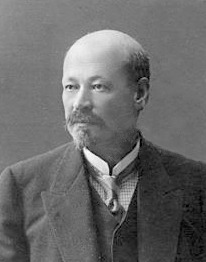
- Born: 27 November 1867; Moscow, Russian Empire
- Died: 28 November 1935 (aged 68); Moscow, Russian SFSR, Soviet Union
- Education: Moscow State University
- Known for: Wolff–Kishner reduction
- Scientific career
- Fields: Chemistry
- Doctoral advisor: Vladimir Markovnikov

Nikolai Matveyevich Kischner (Russian: Николай Матвеевич Кижнер; 27 November 1867 – 28 November 1935) was a Russian chemist and member of the Russian Academy of Sciences.

== Biography ==
After graduating from the Moscow Classical Gymnasium in 1886 Kischner enrolled to the Faculty of Physics and Mathematics of the Moscow State University. Since 1889 he focused on organic chemistry, studying under Vladimir Luginin and Vladimir Markovnikov. In 1890, he completed his courses and started working on a PhD on "Amines and hydrazines of polymethylene series, methods of their preparation and transformation", which he defended in 1895. In 1900, he defended a habilitation on "The action of silver oxide and hydroxylamine on bromamines. On the structure of hexahydrobenzene".

While studying under Markovnikov, he assisted him with teaching of qualitative analysis. Later (1893–1898), he taught special courses in organic chemistry at the Moscow University and the Alexander Military School.

In 1901, Kischner was appointed full professor at Department of Organic Chemistry of the Tomsk Polytechnic University. His work benefited from copious funding, but it was hindered by gangrene of his hands and feet that eventually brought him to disability. In 1913 he left his position and returned to Moscow. In Moscow, his health improved, so that he could continue working until his death in 1935.

== Work ==
In his early years (1891–97) Kischner studied the hydrogenation of benzene using hydriodic acid. After a careful study of the physical and chemical properties of the reaction product (presumably hexahydrobenzene), he concluded that the product is methylcyclopentane, and the reaction proceeds via isomerization of the cycle. These results agreed with works of Markovnikov who discovered the isomerization of naphthenic (alicyclic) compounds.

In 1907–1910, he synthesized cyclobutane ester and studied transformations of cyclobutane into cyclopentane. In 1911, he extended this work on cyclopropane. In 1910 he described the catalytic decomposition of hydrazones, which was later named as the Wolff–Kishner reduction.

In 1912, Kischner later applied the catalytic decomposition to pyrazoline bases and developed a versatile method for the preparation of substituted cyclopropanes by thermal decomposition of pyrazolines. This reaction, known as the Kishner reaction, is easy to conduct and yields pure products at a high yield of 50–70%.

Kischner continued the studies of his mentor Markovnikov. He significantly contributed to the understanding of alicyclic compounds, their intermediate position between fatty (acyclic) and aromatic compounds and relationships with heterocyclic compounds. He also developed several efficient catalytic synthesis methods that were used by the Soviet dye industry. In recognition of his achievements, he was awarded the Butlerov Prize (in 1893 and 1914) and elected as a regular (1929) and then honorary (1934) member of the Russian Academy of Sciences.
