= Ludwig Wolff =

German chemist (1857–1919)

- Born: 27 September 1857; Neustadt an der Weinstraße, Rhine Province, Prussia
- Died: 24 February 1919 (aged 61); Jena Germany
- Education: University of Strasbourg
- Known for: Wolff-Kishner reduction, Wolff rearrangement
- Scientific career
- Workplaces: University of Jena
- Doctoral advisor: Rudolph Fittig

Ludwig Wolff (27 September 1857 – 24 February 1919), born in Neustadt in Palatinate, was a German chemist.

He studied chemistry at the University of Strasbourg, where he received his Ph.D. from Rudolph Fittig in 1882. He became Professor of analytical chemistry at the University of Jena in 1891 and held this position till his death in 1919. In 1911 he published a new reaction now known as the Wolff-Kishner reduction. His name is also associated with the chemical reaction known as the Wolff rearrangement (1912).
