= Methylcyclopentane =

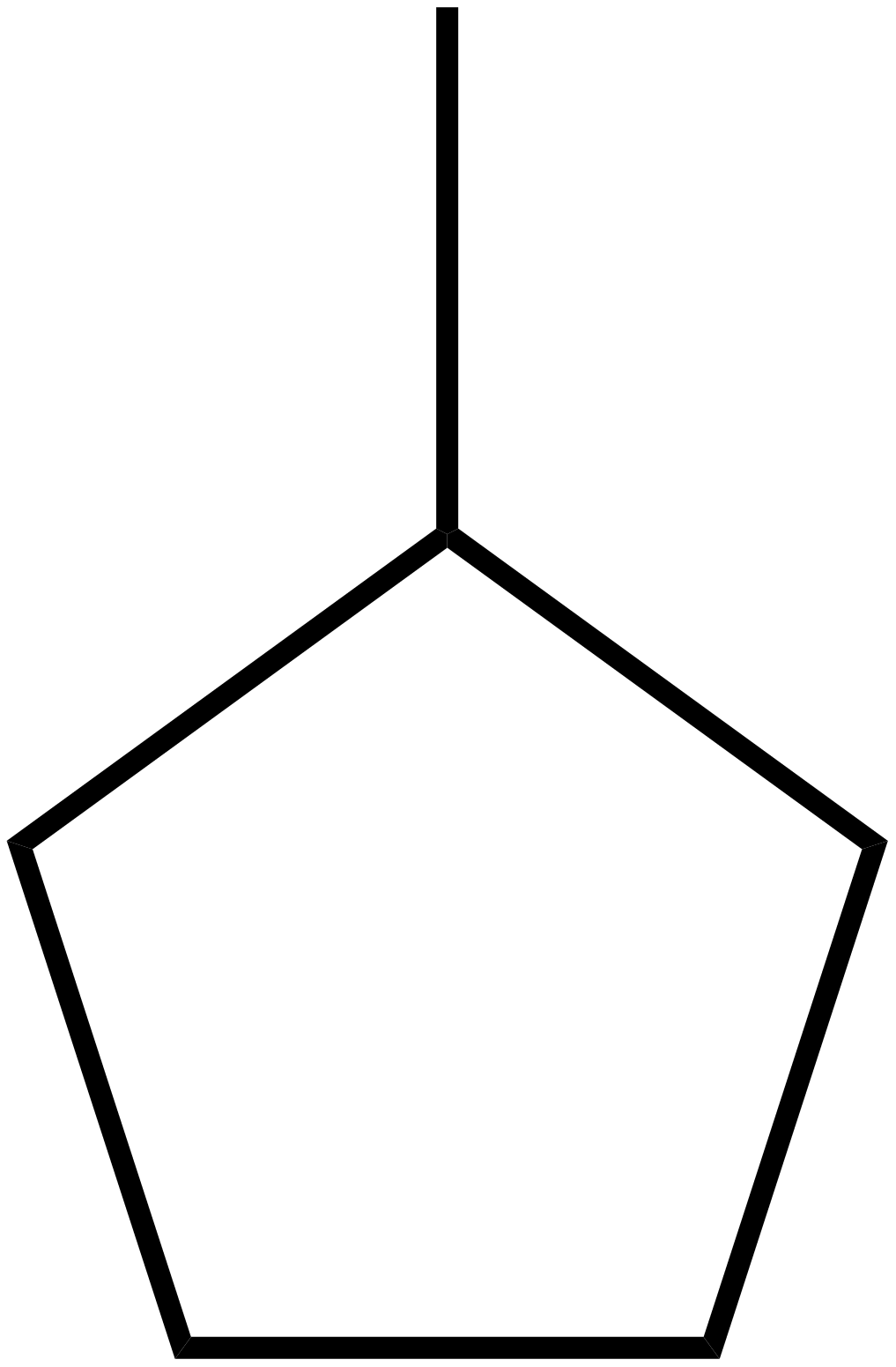

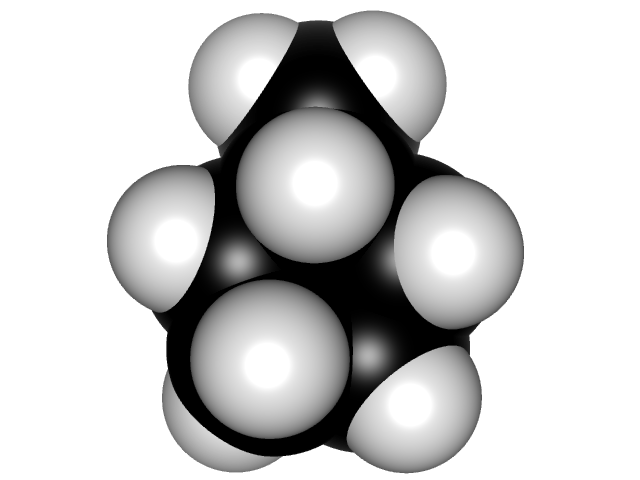

Names
- Preferred IUPAC name Methylcyclopentane

Identifiers
| CAS Number | 96-37-7 |
| 3D model (JSmol) | Interactive image |
| ChEBI | CHEBI:88429 |
| ChEMBL | ChEMBL30940 |
| ChemSpider | 7024 |
| ECHA InfoCard | 100.002.277 |
| EC Number | 202-503-2 |
| PubChem CID | 7296 |
| UNII | 5G26CC1ASK |
| UN number | 2298 |
| CompTox Dashboard (EPA) | DTXSID3025590 |
- InChI: InChI=1S/C6H12/c1-6-4-2-3-5-6/h6H,2-5H2,1H3
- SMILES: CC1CCCC1

Properties
| Chemical formula | C_{6}H_{12} |
| Molar mass | 84.162 g·mol^{−1} |
| Appearance | Colorless liquid |
| Density | 0.749 g/cm^{3} |
| Melting point | −142.4 °C (−224.3 °F; 130.8 K) |
| Boiling point | 71.8 °C (161.2 °F; 344.9 K) |
| Solubility in water | Insoluble |
| Magnetic susceptibility (χ) | −70.17·10^{−6} cm^{3}/mol |

Hazards
- Occupational safety and health (OHS/OSH)
| Main hazards | flammable |
| Flash point | −4 °C (25 °F; 269 K) |
| Autoignition temperature | 260 °C (500 °F; 533 K) |
- Except where otherwise noted, data are given for materials in their standard state (at 25 °C [77 °F], 100 kPa). verify (what is ?) Infobox references

Methylcyclopentane is an organic compound with the chemical formula C_{6}H_{12} or C_{5}H_{9}CH_{3}. It is a colourless, flammable liquid with a faint odor. It is a component of the naphthene fraction of petroleum usually obtained as a mixture with cyclohexane. It is mainly converted in naphthene reformers to benzene.

As of early 1990s, it was present in American and European gasoline in small amounts, and by 2011 its share in US gasoline varied between 1 and 3%. It has a research octane number of 103 and motor octane number of 95.

The C_{6} core of methylcyclopentane is not perfectly planar and can pucker to alleviate stress in its structure.

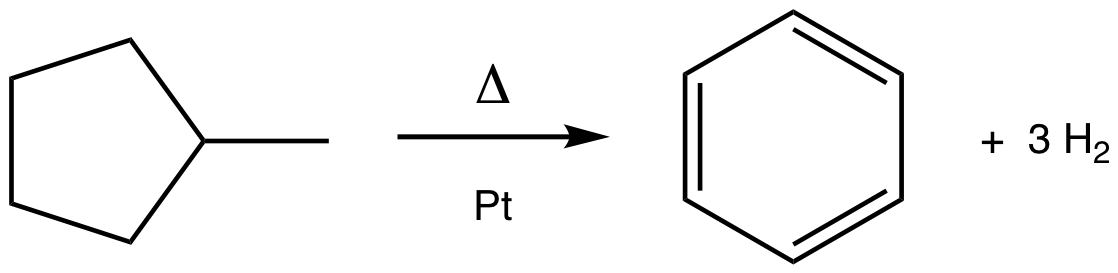
The conversion of methylcyclopentane to benzene is a classic aromatization reaction, specifically a dehydroisomerization. This platinum (Pt)-catalyzed process is practiced on scale in the production of gasoline from petroleum.

== History ==
Methylcyclopentane was first synthesized in 1888 by Paul Caspar Freer and W. H. Perkin Jr. by a Wurtz reaction of sodium and 1,5-dibromohexane. They named it methylpentamethylene since the modern nomenclature wasn't developed until 1892 Geneva Rules.

In 1895, Nikolai Kischner discovered that methylcyclopentane was the reaction product of hydrogenation of benzene using hydriodic acid. Prior to that, several chemists (such as Marcellin Berthelot in 1867, and Adolf von Baeyer in 1870) had tried and failed to synthesize cyclohexane using this method.
