= Stephen Brunauer =

American chemist, government scientist, and university teacher

- Born: István Brunauer; February 12, 1903; Budapest, Hungary
- Died: July 6, 1986 (aged 83); Potsdam, New York, USA
- Education: Columbia University; George Washington University; Johns Hopkins University
- Spouse(s): Esther Delia Caukin (m. 1931; died 1959) Dalma Hunyadi (m. 1961)
- Children: 3
- Military career
- Allegiance: United States
- Branch: Naval Reserve
- Conflicts: World War II

Stephen Brunauer (February 12, 1903 – July 6, 1986) was an American research chemist, government scientist, and university teacher. He resigned from his position with the U.S. Navy during the McCarthy era, when he found it impossible to refute anonymous charges that he was disloyal to the U.S.

== Early years ==
Stephen Brunauer was born István Brunauer on February 12, 1903, to a Jewish family in Budapest, Hungary. His father was blind and his mother worked as a seamstress. He emigrated to the United States in 1921 and attended City College of New York and Columbia University, majoring in English and chemistry. He received his A.B. from Columbia in 1925. He pursued graduate studies in chemistry and engineering, earning his master's degree in 1929 from George Washington University, where he was a student of Edward Teller, who later described his confidence in asserting his theories and challenging his teachers. While a student, he belonged briefly to the Young Workers' League, a Communist front organization. He later described it as "a glorified social club with dances and picnics and infrequent participation in picket lines and strikes."

== Government career ==
He became an American citizen around 1925 and began working for the Fixed Nitrogen Research Laboratory of the U.S. Department of Agriculture in Washington, D.C., in 1928. He married Esther Delia Caukin in 1931, an expert in international relations who worked for the American Association of University Women and, after 1944, for the U.S. State Department. They lived in Washington, D.C., with the exception of one year spent in Baltimore while he earned his doctorate from Johns Hopkins University in 1933. They had a son in 1934, who died December 1937, and two daughters in 1938 and 1942. His doctoral thesis led to the development of BET theory, based on work he did with Paul H. Emmett and Edward Teller. He left the Department of Agriculture following the attack on Pearl Harbor and joined the U.S. Naval Reserve, and by 1942 was heading its high explosives research group in the Bureau of Ordnance. He recruited Albert Einstein as a consultant to the Navy in 1943. Einstein had corresponded with Esther Brunauer before the war when he was trying to help German academics find employment in the U.S.

At the end of World War II, having reached the rank of commander on November 9, 1945, he left military service and became a civilian employee of the Navy with the same responsibilities as before. He visited Hungary to investigate the state of scientific research there and assisted several scientists in emigrating to the U.S. The personal contacts he made during this trip with may have provided the basis for questions raised about his loyalty to the United States in the 1950s.

The Atomic Energy Commission denied him a security clearance because of his earlier membership in the Young Workers' League, but he continued to work as a government scientist. He successfully passed several other security reviews that his work required and became chief chemist in the Research and Development Section of the Navy's Bureau of Ordnance.

In 1950, when Senator Joseph McCarthy launched the anti-Communist crusade known by his name, McCarthyism, he named Esther Brunauer as one of the State Department employees whose loyalty he questioned. The Senate's Subcommittee on the Investigation of Loyalty of State Department Employees, commonly known as the Tydings Committee, investigated McCarthy's charges against her and exonerated her in July. The U.S. Navy suspended Stephen Brunauer's security clearance on April 10, 1951; as a result, his wife was suspended by the State Department and subjected to another security review. Two months later, on June 14, when it appeared that the Navy was going to deny him his security clearance, he resigned, saying that he feared the process "must have been a source of embarrassment and inconvenience to the Navy". He said the review process left government employees defenseless because they "cannot learn the identity of those who have given derogatory information" and "much of the information on which the charges are based is withheld". He called the experience "costly, disheartening and nerve-wracking". He acknowledged his association with the Young Workers' League in the 1920s but said that he had been a "strong anti-Communist" for 18 years. His wife was forced from the State Department on June 16, 1952, having been identified as a "security risk" without explanation. She said she thought the "official reason" was her marriage but the real reason was "political expediency".

== After government service ==
He found work with the Portland Cement Association in Chicago. He became chair of the chemistry department at Clarkson University in 1965 and the first director of the Clarkson Institute of Colloid and Surface Chemistry, retiring in 1973.

His first wife died in 1959. In 1961 he married Dalma Hunyadi, a Hungarian-born professor at Clarkson. Together then wrote a book about the nineteenth-century Hungarian poet and dramatist Dezső Kosztolányi.

He died on July 6, 1986, in Potsdam, New York, and was buried in Potsdam, New York. The day before his death he completed a research paper evaluating BET theory. Upon his death, the American Chemical Society called him "undoubtedly one of the most highly respected surface scientists of our time". It said that "in 1951, his career again underwent a marked change of direction", omitting any mention of his security clearance problems.

The American Ceramics Society bestows the Brunauer Award annually in his honor. Clarkson bestows its Brunauer Award to a graduating senior annually.

=== Writings ===
- The Adsorption of Gases and Vapors, Volume 1 (Oxford University Press, 1943)
- "Einstein in the U.S. Navy", in Burtron H. Davis and William P. Hettinger Jr., editors, Heterogeneous Catalysis: Selected American Histories (American Chemical Society, 1983)
- S. Brunauer, P.H. Emmett and E. Teller, Adsorption of Gases in Multimolecular Layers. Journal of the American Chemical Society, Vol. 60 (1938), 309–19.
