= C10H12 =

The molecular formula C_{10}H_{12} (molar mass: 132.20 g/mol, exact mass: 132.0939 u) may refer to:

- Basketane
- Dicyclopentadiene
- 2,4-Dimethylstyrene
- 2,5-Dimethylstyrene
- Tetralin
