= Basketene =

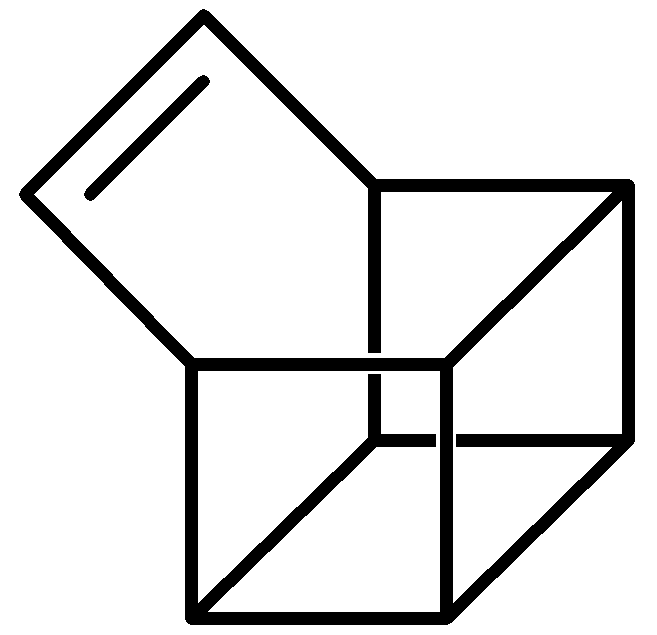

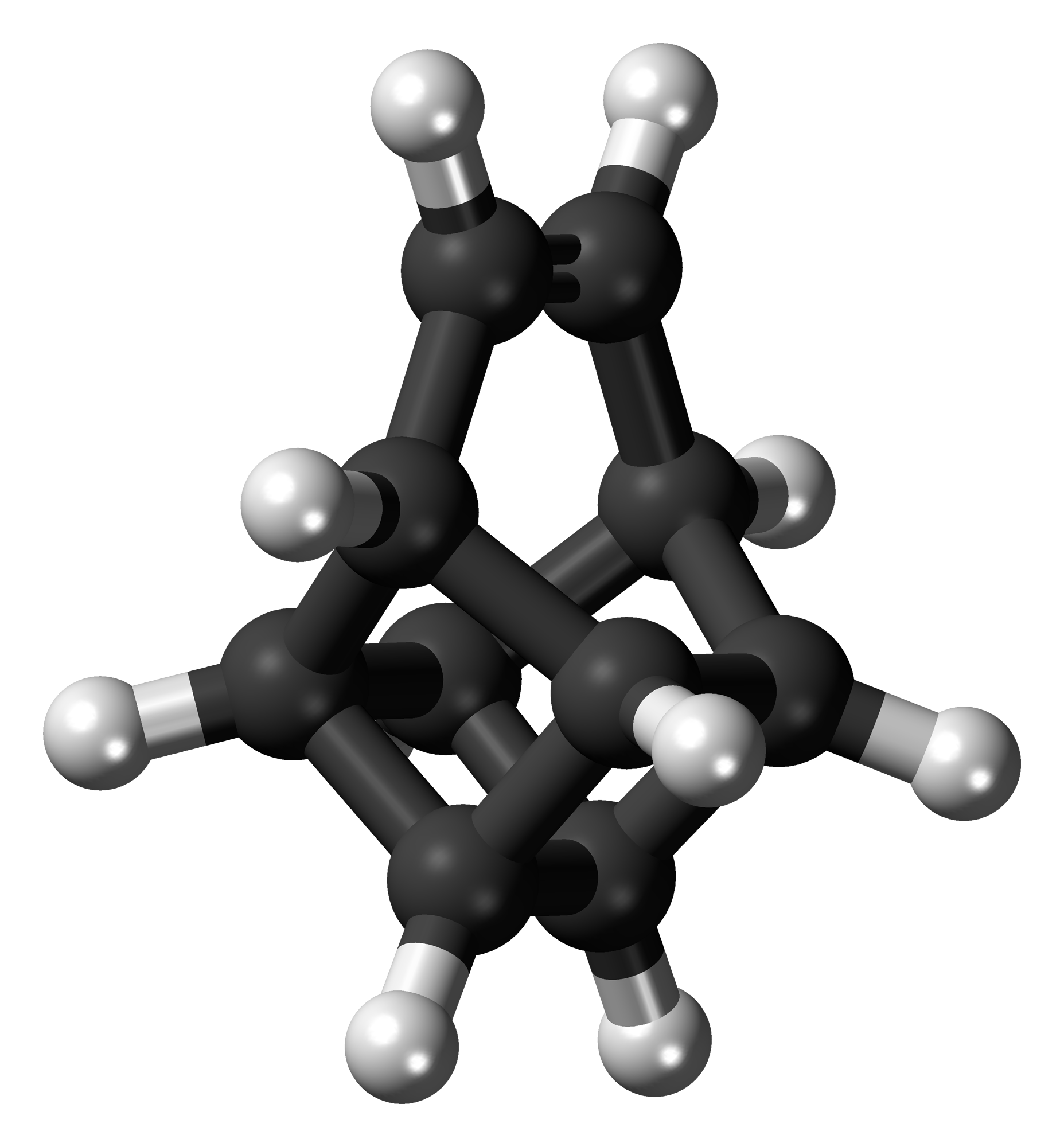

Names
- Preferred IUPAC name Pentacyclo[4.4.0.0^{2,5}.0^{3,8}.0^{4,7}]dec-9-ene
- Other names Bishomocubene

Identifiers
CAS Number	5603-34-9
3D model (JSmol)	Interactive image
ChemSpider	122156
PubChem CID	138538
CompTox Dashboard (EPA)	DTXSID30971411
- InChI: InChI=1S/C10H10/c1-2-4-7-5-3(1)6-8(4)10(7)9(5)6/h1-10H Key: LXQOIQYQFRKBLV-UHFFFAOYSA-N; InChI=1/C10H10/c1-2-4-7-5-3(1)6-8(4)10(7)9(5)6/h1-10H
- SMILES: C2=CC5C1C4C3C1C2C3C45

Properties
Chemical formula	C_{10}H_{10}
Molar mass	130.186 g/mol
- Except where otherwise noted, data are given for materials in their standard state (at 25 °C [77 °F], 100 kPa). verify (what is ?) Infobox references

Basketene (IUPAC name: pentacyclo[4.4.0.0^{2,5}.0^{3,8}.0^{4,7}]dec-9-ene) is an organic compound with the formula C_{10}H_{10}. It is a polycyclic alkene and the dehydrogenated version of basketane, which was named for its structural similarity to a basket. Due to its hydrocarbon composition and unique structure, the chemical compound is of considerable interest to those examining energy surfaces of these (CH)_{10} cage molecules and what possible factors influence their minima. Additionally, the complex structure of this compound has intrigued researchers studying the chemistry of highly strained ring systems . Basketene and its family of derivatives also have important chemical and physical properties. These molecules all tend to have a high standard enthalpy of formation, combined with their high density, leading to possible uses in explosives.

== Synthesis ==
Basketene has been synthesized as follows. First cyclooctatetraene (1) undergoes thermal, electrocyclic isomerization (to 2), followed by a Diels–Alder reaction with maleic anhydride (3). [2 + 2] photochemical cycloaddition (4 to 5) closes the cage structure, which sodium carbonate hydrolyzes (to 6); lead(IV) acetate in pyridine then decarboxylates oxidatively to basketene (7).

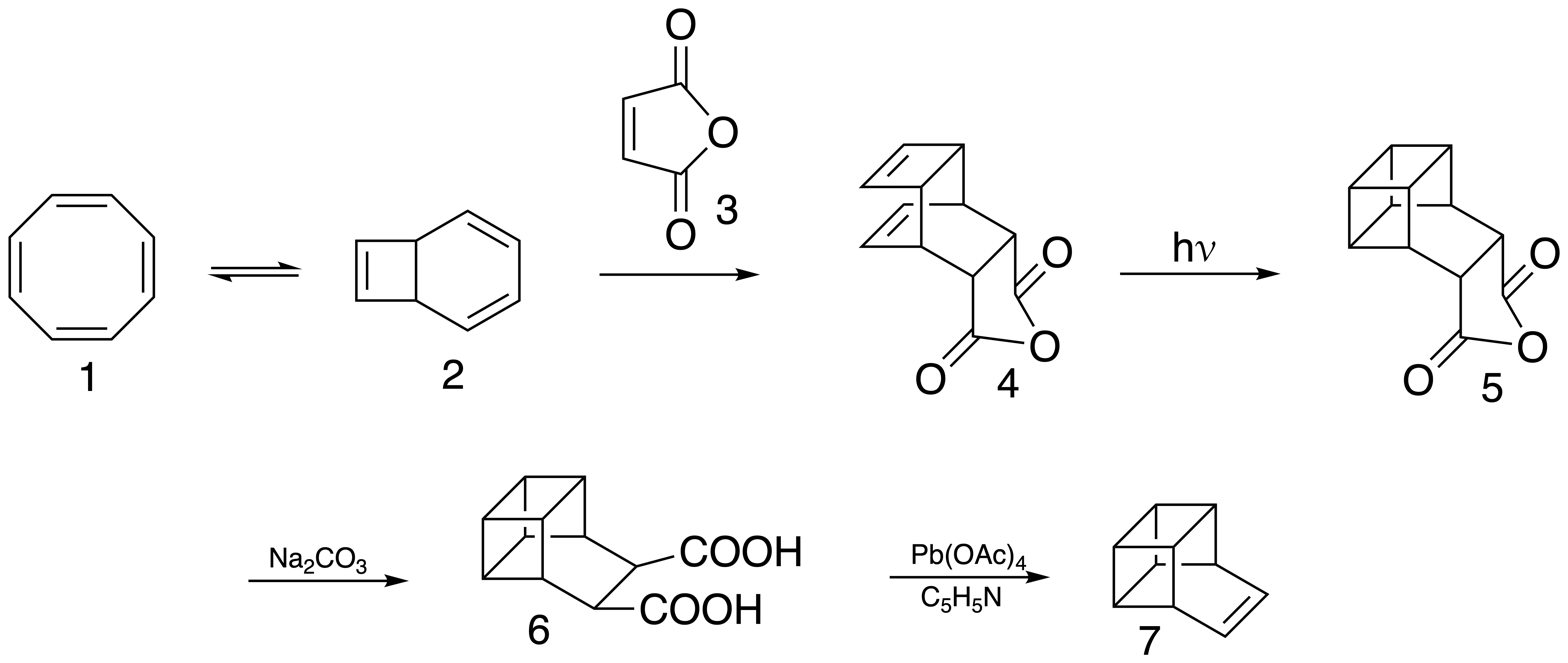

== Reactions ==
Basketene and other cage molecules are important for discovering and testing new concepts of bonding and reactivity. Oxidizing basketene with osmium tetroxide selectively cleaves the alkene to two carboxylic acid groups; ketonization then gives a cubane precursor.

Basketene also undergoes a number of different rearrangements.

=== Rearrangements ===
Heating Basketene alone produces Nenitzescu’s Hydrocarbon. The reaction proceeds through a reverse Diels-Alder intermediate in order to give 8 at 110 ˚C. From 8, a 3,3 shift occurs to give Nenitzescu's hydrocarbon (9).

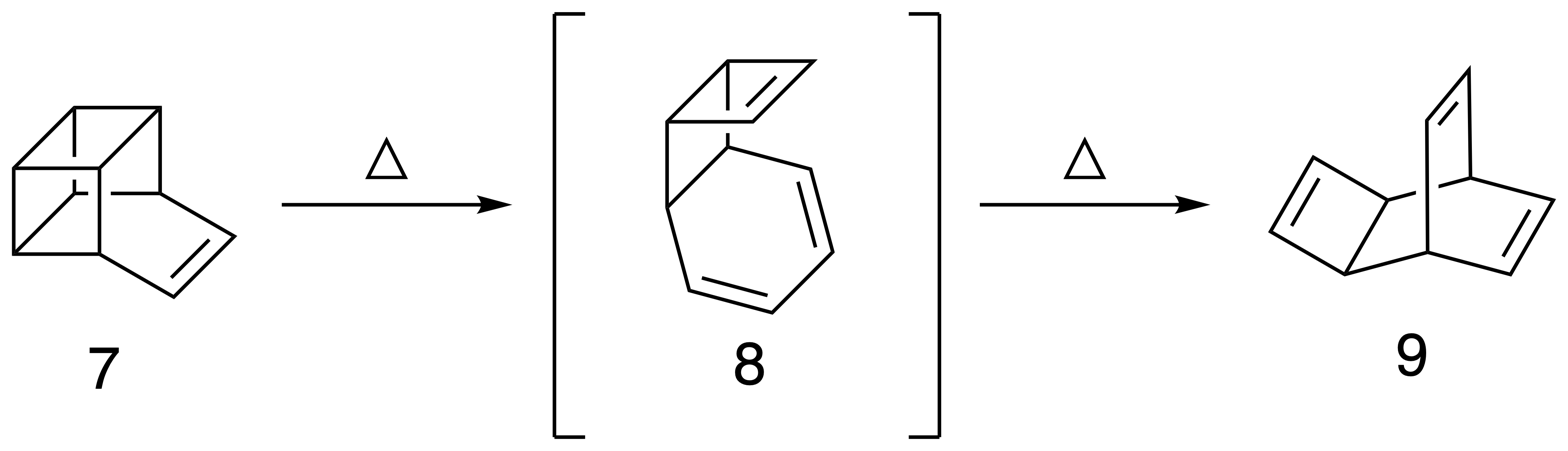

The intermediate 8 can be captured by trapping it as a 1:1 adduct with maleic anhydride.

Basketene can also undergo the following thermal and photochemical rearrangement reactions. The photo-induced conrotary opening of 8 gives cis,cis,trans-cyclooctatriene (10). Furthermore, the photo-rearrangement of 10 provides the derivative 11. 11 will undergo a direct photochemical (2+2) cyclization closure to 12.

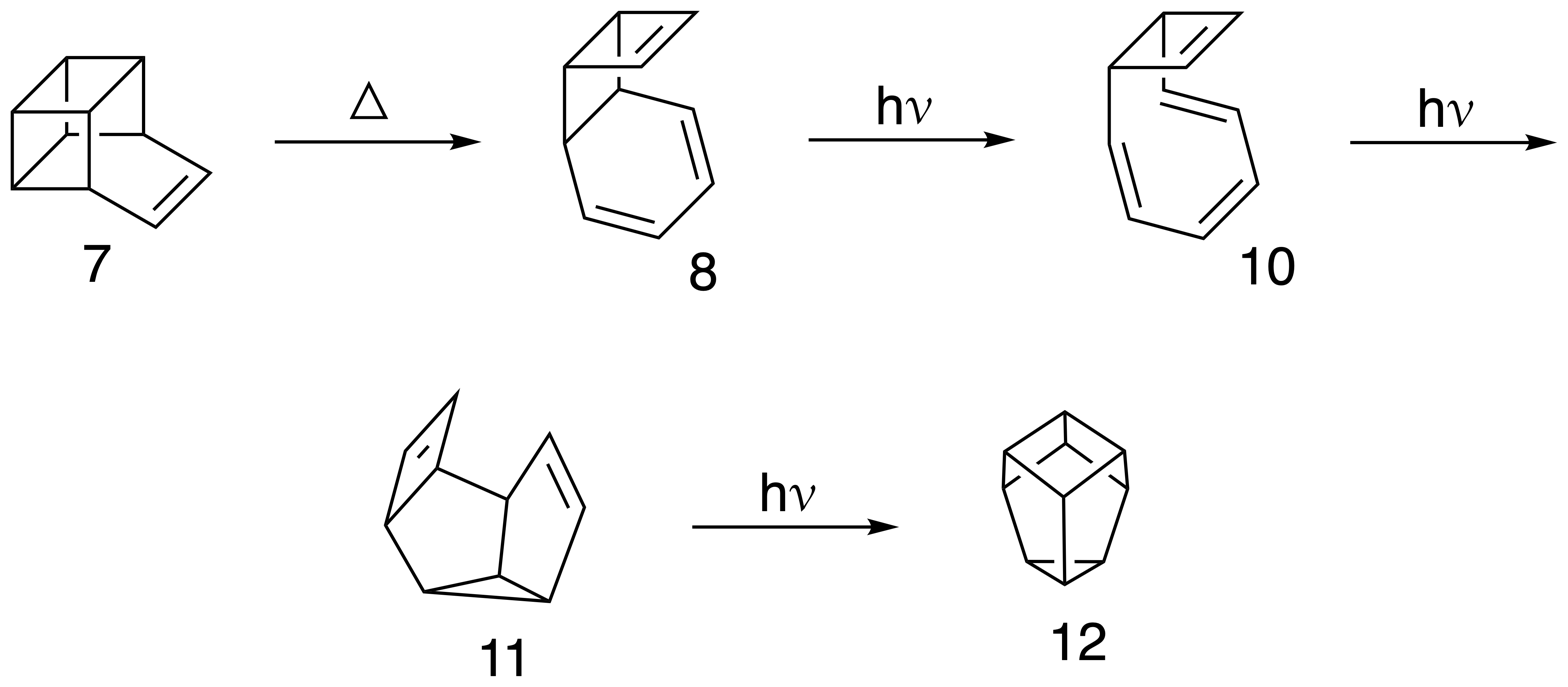

Basktene also rearranges into snoutene when in solution with Silver nitrate

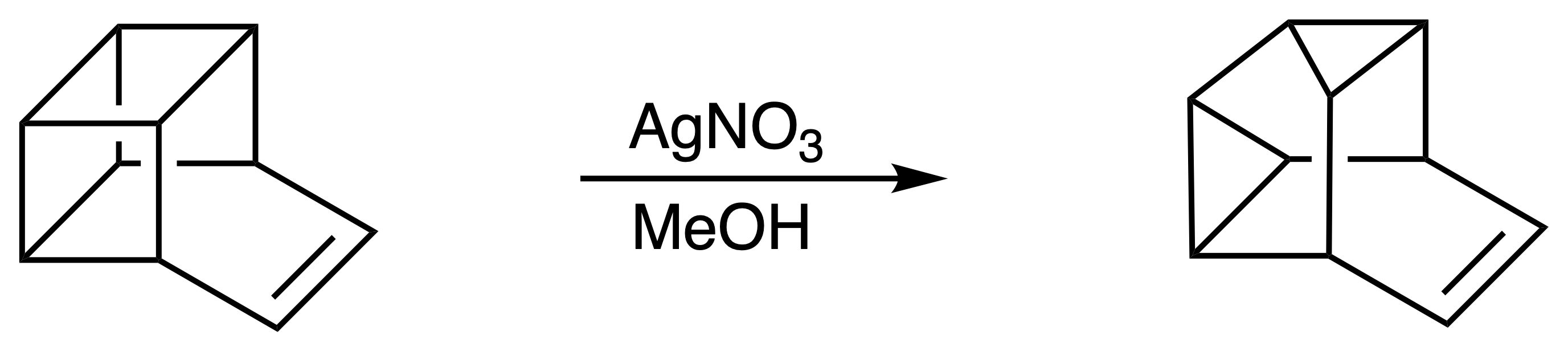
