= Paul Hugh Emmett =

American chemical engineer (1900–1985)

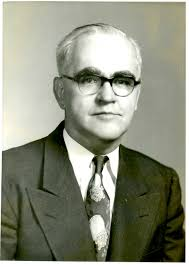
- Emmett in 1955
- Born: September 22, 1900; Portland, Oregon, US
- Died: April 22, 1985 (aged 84); Portland, Oregon, US
- Resting place: River View Cemetery Portland, Oregon
- Education: Undergraduate:Oregon State University; Graduate: California Institute of Technology
- Known for: Catalysis, BET theory
- Awards: Appointed to National Academy of Sciences
- Scientific career
- Workplaces: Johns Hopkins University California Institute of Technology Mellon Institute of Industrial Research Columbia University Oregon State University Portland State University
- Doctoral advisor: Arthur F. Benton
- Notable students: Rowland Hansford

Paul Hugh Emmett (September 22, 1900 – April 22, 1985) was an American chemist best known for his pioneering work in the field of catalysis and for his work on the Manhattan Project during World War II. He spearheaded the research to separate isotopes of uranium and to develop a corrosive uranium gas. Emmett also made significant contributions to BET Theory which explains the relationship between surface area and gas adsorption. He served on the faculty of Johns Hopkins University for 23 years throughout his scientific career.

== Early life ==
Paul Hugh Emmett was born on September 22, 1900, in Portland, Oregon to John Hugh Emmett (1864–1943) and Lavina Hutchins (1870–1941). Emmett's father was a railroad engineer. For a year in his early childhood, Emmett's family lived in a rail car while his mother worked as a cook for the rail company. Emmett attended Washington High School where he excelled in language and mathematics classes. Among his acquaintances in high school was Linus Pauling, future two-time Nobel Prize winner. Emmett had a fear of public speaking, so he enrolled in the debate team in both high school and college to gain proficiency. His first high school science classes, physics and chemistry, were taken during his senior year of high school. Emmett's senior year chemistry teacher, William Green, is said to have inspired him to pursue a career in chemistry. Later in life, Emmett expressed that perhaps high schools are "simply not flexible enough for the people in the genius class."

In 1918, Emmett began his studies in chemical engineering at Oregon State University. After completing his bachelor's degree in 1922, Emmett pursued his PhD in physical chemistry at the California Institute of Technology under Arthur F. Benton. At the time, the California Institute of Technology was paying PhD students nearly double what other programs were offering, making the university an enticing choice for Emmett.

== Career ==
In 1925, Emmett accepted a teaching position at Oregon State University, but only remained for a year. In 1926, he moved to Washington, D.C. to work at the US Department of Agriculture's Fixed Nitrogen Research Laboratory. For over a decade, Emmett led experiments attempting to incorporate catalysis into the synthesis of ammonia. He also worked on implementing catalysis in projects ranging form the decomposition of ammonia to water-gas conversion. Emmett also served as a lecturer at George Washington University while in Washington, D.C.

Emmett joined Johns Hopkins University in 1937 to establish the Department of Chemical and Gas Engineering alongside Ralph Witt, Charles Bonilla, and Lloyd Logan. He was the chair of the department from 1937 to 1943. During this period, Emmett published his famous work on the Brunauer-Emmett-Teller (BET) Theory, which later earned him a Nobel Prize in Chemistry nomination in 1967.

In 1943, Emmett left Johns Hopkins University to become a division chief on the Manhattan Project at Columbia University under the directive of Harold Urey. For 16 months, Emmett's lab focused on separating uranium isotopes and converting uranium into a corrosive gas. Emmett remained on the Manhattan Project as a consultant for the Oak Ridge National Laboratory for 22 years. In 1944, he relocated to the Mellon Institute of Industrial Research in Pittsburgh, PA to conduct petroleum research.

In 1955, Emmett moved back to Johns Hopkins University, albeit in a different department, as the William R. Grace Professor of Chemistry. He was active both nationally and internationally with various chemistry committees and conferences. He was elected to National Academy of Sciences in 1955. Emmett finished his career at Johns Hopkins University, retiring in 1971 with the professor emeritus distinction.

For the remainder of his life, Emmett was a visiting research professor at Portland State University, undertaking new research areas, giving seminar talks, and teaching advanced courses in catalysis.

== Personal life ==
Emmett was a close friend and classmate of Linus Pauling with whom he attended high school, college, and graduate school.

Emmett was married to Leila Jones on July 14, 1930, until her death in 1968. He had a short second marriage which ended in divorce. Pauling became brother-in-law to Emmett after he married Pauling's older sister, Pauline, in 1976. She survived him, eventually dying in 2003 at the age of 101.

== Death and legacy ==
Emmett had Parkinson's disease and a brain tumor during the later stages of his life. He died on April 22, 1985, at the age of 84.

In total, Emmett authored 164 publications, some of which are still cited to this day. The Paul Hugh Emmett award was established in 1972 by the Catalysis Society of North America.

== Research ==
=== Doctoral work and thesis ===
Emmett's doctoral advisor, Arthur F. Benton, had studied under Hugh Stott Taylor at Princeton University. Emmett worked with Benton to study the role of nickel catalysts in the formation of water from hydrogen and oxygen gas. Emmett's thesis was on the autocatalysis of the nickel and iron metal oxide reduction reaction with hydrogen gas. In 1925 while at Caltech, Emmett and Linus Pauling published a paper together on the crystal structure of barium sulfate.

=== Nitrogen fixation ===
At the Fixed Nitrogen Research Laboratory, Emmett's research goals were to study nitrogen fixation and its applications to the production of fertilizer, food, and explosives. Emmett also studied the synthesis and decomposition of ammonia over iron catalysts and gaseous adsorption during his 11 years at this lab. He used stable nitrogen isotopes to study the mechanisms of the catalytic reactions.

=== BET theory ===
In conjunction with Stephen Brunauer and Edward Teller, Emmett developed the Brunauer-Emmett-Teller Theory which forms the basis for calculating the surface area of a material given the physical gaseous adsorption that takes place across the material's surface. Their theory was published in 1938 in the Journal of the American Chemical Society and has been cited over 16,000 times. The ramifications of this theory are immense in the catalysis field and this theory is still the "most frequently used method for surface area determinations of porous carbons."

=== Manhattan Project ===
Emmett's lab focused on separating Uranium-235 and Uranium-238, as the first of five labs to work on the atomic bomb. They used a fluorocarbon polymeric barrier to separate the two isotopes via diffusion. The lab also sought to synthesize the corrosive uranium hexafluoride gas. However, this gas corroded through the material used to make it, so a researcher in Emmett's lab came up with a material that served as the predecessor to Teflon. Later in life, Emmett expressed great pride in his work on the Manhattan project.

=== Petroleum research ===
During his 11 years at the Mellon Institute of Industrial Research, much of Emmett's work was funded by Gulf Oil. Emmett improved on the Fischer-Tropsch process, a key process used to synthesize petroleum hydrocarbon substitutes. He used radioisotopes like Carbon-14 to study the mechanism of catalytic reactions. In the 1950s, Emmett's research transitioned toward the field of catalytic cracking in response to a concern in oil supply.

== Honors and awards ==
- 1939 - Honorary doctorate from Oregon State College
- 1953 - Pittsburgh Award from Pittsburgh, PA; awarded by the American Chemical Society
- 1955 - Elected to the National Academy of Sciences
- 1958 - Kendall Award from the American Chemical Society
- 1964 - Honorary doctorate from University of Lyon
- 1969 - Honorary doctorate from Clarkson College
- 1970 - Catalyst Club of Philadelphia Award
- 1970 - Maryland Section Award from the American Chemical Society
- 1972 - Catalysis Society of North America establishes the Paul Emmett Award in his honor
- 1974 - Honorary doctorate from University of Wisconsin-Milwaukee
- 1974 - Distinguished Service Award from Oregon State University
- 1976 - Honorary doctorate of law from Hokkaido University in Sapporo, Japan
- 1977 - Distinguished Alumni Award from the California Institute of Technology
- 1980 - Howard Vollum Award for Science and Technology from Reed College
- 1980 - Chemical Pioneer Award from the American Institute of Chemists

== Notable publications ==
- Catalysis vol 1-5 (1954 - 1957)
- Absorption of Gases in Multimolecular Layers (1938)
- Calculation of Thermodynamic Functions of Adsorbed Molecules from Adsorption Isotherm Measurements: Nitrogen on Graphon (1951)
- The Catalytic Synthesis of Water Vapor in Contact with Metallic Nickel (1925)
- The Reduction of Nickelous and Ferric Oxides by Hydrogen (1925)
- The Crystal Structure of Barite (1925)
