= Esther Brunauer =

American diplomat (1901–1959)

Esther Caukin Brunauer
- Born: July 7, 1901; Near Jackson, California, US
- Died: June 26, 1959 (aged 57); Evanston, Illinois, US
- Education: Mills College; Stanford University
- Spouse: Stephen Brunauer (m. 1931; died 1959)
- Children: 3

Esther Caukin Brunauer (July 7, 1901 – June 26, 1959) was an American diplomat who was a longtime employee of the American Association of University Women (AAUW) and then a U.S. government civil servant, who with her husband was targeted by Senator Joseph McCarthy's campaign against U.S. State Department officials whose loyalty to the U.S. he questioned.

== Early years ==
Esther Delia Caukin was born on July 7, 1901, near Jackson, California, to parents born in California. Her father, an electrician, had left-wing political views. Her mother worked as a clerk, supported women's suffrage, and campaigned for Woodrow Wilson in 1914. The family moved frequently during Esther's childhood. She graduated from Girls' High School in San Francisco in 1920 and then attended Mills College, graduating with a B.A. in history in 1924. She earned a doctorate from Stanford University in 1927, financing her education in part with a fellowship from the American Association of University Women (AAUW). She moved to Washington, D.C., to work on the AAUW staff and headed its international affairs program until 1944.

== Marriage ==
Esther Caukin married Stephen Brunauer (1903–1986) on July 8, 1931. He was an immigrant to the U.S. from Hungary, trained as a chemist, who had belonged to the Young Workers' League, a Communist front, until 1927. In the 1930s he worked as a research scientist for the U.S. Department of Agriculture. During World War II he joined the U.S. Naval Reserve and led its high explosives research group. He gained the rank of commander before changing his status to that of a civilian employee of the U.S. Navy in 1944. The Atomic Energy Commission denied him a security clearance because of his earlier membership in the Young Workers' League, but he continued to work as a scientist for the U.S. Navy.

The Brunauers had a son who lived only a few months in 1934 and two daughters who were born in 1938 and 1942.

== American Association of University Women ==
The Brunauers spent time in Germany on fellowships in 1933, during the Nazi seizure of power. Returning to the U.S., Esther Brunauer became an advocate for collective security in opposition to the pacifism of many women's rights advocates of the period. She headed a National Defense Study Commission that published a study of national defense in 1937 that the U.S. Chief of Naval Operations assessed in 1950 as "largely responsible for converting various pacifist organizations in this country and thus making possible an immediate program of rearmament". On behalf of the AAUW, she became a key figure in such organizational alliances as the Committee to Defend America by Aiding the Allies and the Women's Action Committee for Victory and Lasting Peace. She campaigned on behalf of the AAUW for the relaxation of the U.S. Neutrality Acts. In 1941 she authored an attack on isolationism and appeasement, "Relationship of Foreign Policy to National Defense", that said:

Isolationism exists and flourishes most widely where there is the least knowledge of the world we live in–and in some cases it is deepened by a refusal to heed what information does seep in.

It seems to involve a curiously twisted national egotism. In essence, the isolationist's view can contemplate only one potential aggressor in the world, and that is America. Therefore, if one is enlightened and believes in social progress, one opposes anything that will permit America to play a part in world affairs, because of the fear that this country will seek to dominate others and by its actions will provoke others into war.

In some cases, isolationism is an attempt to escape from responsibility, but it is more often a fear of power as such without regard to whether that power is to be used for good or for evil.

== State Department ==
Brunauer joined the U.S. State Department in March 1944 where she was responsible for international organizational affairs. She first worked on planning for post-war international cooperation, helping draft plans for the United Nations and United Nations Educational, Scientific and Cultural Organization (UNESCO). In 1945 she served as an adviser to the U.S. delegation at the conference that founded the United Nations. She was promoted to the rank of minister, the third U.S. woman to hold that State Department rank, and represented the U.S. at preparatory meetings of UNESCO and several of its overseas conferences.

The isolationist Chicago Tribune criticized Esther Bruanuer for her internationalism as early as 1941. In 1947, Representative Fred Busbey attacked her by name when denouncing "pro-Communist fellow travelers and muddle heads" in the State Department. She passed a government security review in 1948. In 1950, when Senator Joseph McCarthy launched the anti-Communist crusade known by his name, he identified her as one of the State Department employees whose disloyalty he could prove. On March 13, 1950, when he narrowed his suspects from his early list of 81, he included her as one of nine he named to the Senate's Subcommittee on the Investigation of Loyalty of State Department Employees, commonly known as the Tydings Committee, which was investigating his charges. Among her defenders were Eleanor Lansing Dulles, a State Department official from a politically prominent family. and several AAUW officials. Milton Eisenhower wrote a letter in support of her, as did her neighbor former U.S. Senator Joe Ball, a Minnesota Republican, who wrote that Brunauer was "perhaps the most violently anti-Communist person I know".

Brunauer herself had long supported the government's loyalty-security review program. In 1948 she had written:

There is certainly nothing vindictive or arbitrary in the attitudes of the people who are carrying out this program, and I have the feeling that, as unpleasant as this situation is, it does provide an opportunity for straightening up the record and being protected in the future.

Testifying in front of the committee, she reported receiving anonymous telephone calls with "death threats and profanity". She said: "My husband is a loyal American ... an outspoken foe of Communism. I am a loyal American. I am not a Communist. I have never engaged in Communist activities. I never had any sympathy for a doctrine which conflicts with the basic principles of our American democracy." The committee exonerated her in July, but she found some of her activities at the State Department curtailed.

During her husband's years of federal government service, he had passed four security clearance investigations. In April 1951, while working as a high explosives expert, the U.S. Navy suspended his security clearance to conduct another review. As a consequence, the State Department suspended his wife and subjected her to another security review along with him. Stephen resigned from the Navy rather than allow himself to be found disloyal or labelled a security risk. Esther persisted with the review and was forced from the State Department on June 16, 1952. News of her ouster only became public several months later. She showed the press the letter that said the action was based on the fact that she was a "security risk" but did not specify the grounds for that determination. She said she thought the "official reason" was her marriage but the real reason was "political expediency". She said she hoped the incoming Eisenhower administration would review the federal government's loyalty-security program "fearlessly and thoroughly".

She once commented on the role of gender in her loyalty-security review after facing an all-male panel:

Either their opinion of the reliability of women in professional positions was very low, or else they knew of many men who shared State Department secrets with their wives, and thought that a woman ... must behave the same way.

== Later years ==
After leaving government service, she worked briefly for the Library of Congress and then relocated with her husband to Evanston, Illinois, in September 1952. She worked as associate director of the Film Council of America and then in publishing at Rand McNally and Follett Publishing. She died of a heart condition in Evanston on June 26, 1959.
