= Organic molecular cages =

Organic molecular cages represent a unique class of porous materials characterized by their discrete molecular nature and well-defined internal cavities, formed through covalent bonds between precisely designed organic building blocks. These molecular structures contain organized frameworks surrounding a central cavity, where organic components are precisely arranged to create functional internal spaces. Unlike extended networks such as metal-organic frameworks (MOFs) and covalent organic frameworks (COFs), these cage compounds exist as distinct molecular entities, offering advantages in solution processability and structural precision.

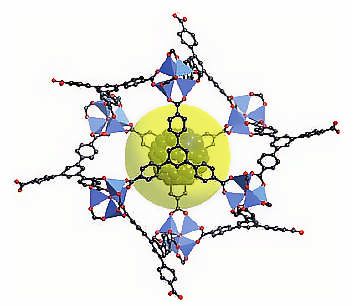
MOF-177 single organic cage

The field of organic molecular cages emerged in the early 2000s, pioneered by the work of Cram, Lehn, and Pedersen, whose foundational research on host-guest chemistry and molecular recognition earned them the 1987 Nobel Prize.

The area, which relies on molecular self-assembly, is inspired by biological precedents are ferritin, capsid, and the tobacco mosaic virus, which are formed by the self-assembly of protein subunits into a polyhedral symmetry.

Large organic cages were reported by Tozawa and Cooper in 2009, introducing permanently porous organic cages with intrinsic cavities. The ability to control cavity size and chemical environment at the molecular level distinguishes these materials from traditional porous systems.

== Structure and design ==
=== Basic structural components ===
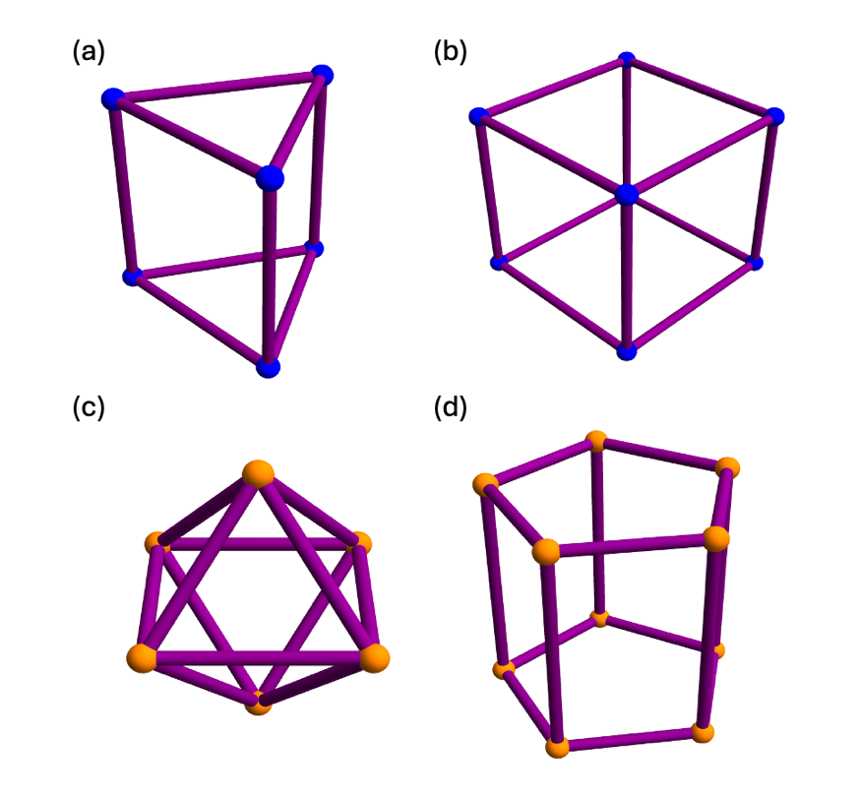
Molecular cage structures with linkers (rods) and nodes (spheres): (a) triangular prism, (b) cubic, (c) octahedral, and (d) pentagonal prism

Organic molecular cages can be viewed as being composed of nodes and linkers. Nodes are the cornerstones of cage architecture and are typically rigid. Common node geometries include trigonal (three-directional), tetrahedral (four-directional), and octahedral (six-directional). Complementing the nodes, linkers connect these vertices to complete the cage. These linkers are typically linear or slightly bent organic molecules that contain pairs reactive end groups. Typical linkers are dialdehydes, diamines, and diboronic acids.

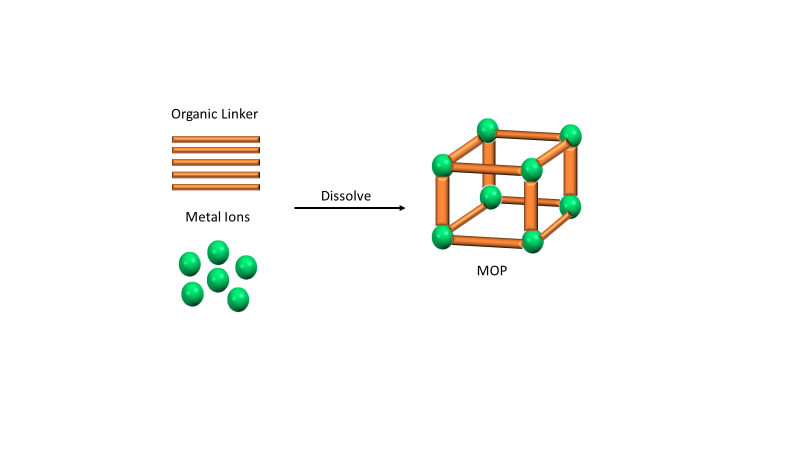
MOP synthesis

== Classification ==
=== Chemical composition-based classification ===
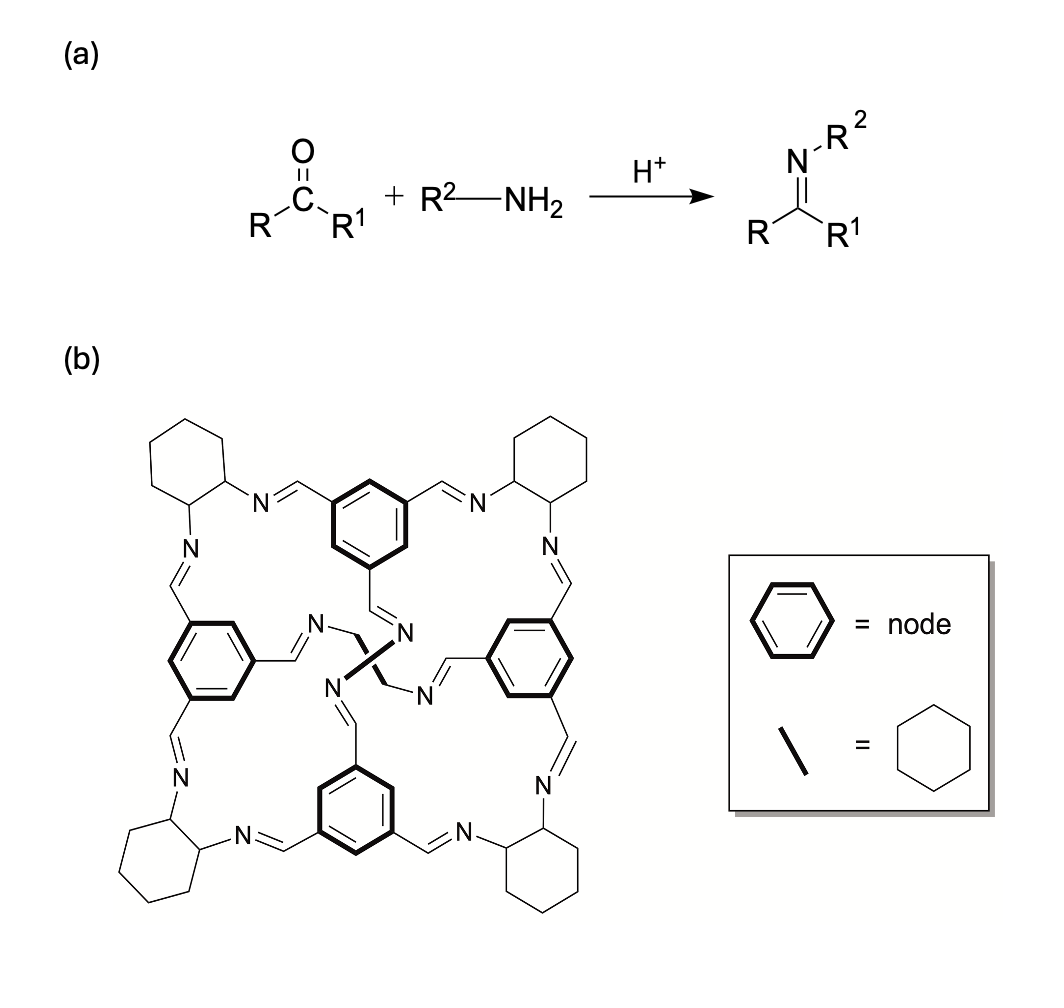
Imine-based covalent organic cage: (a) imine condensation reaction scheme (b) imine-based covalent organic cage

The most extensively studied category of organic molecular cages are imine-based cages, formed through Schiff base condensation reactions. This reaction involves the condensation of aldehyde and amine groups to form imine bonds (C=N). The reversible nature of imine bond formation enables error correction during synthesis, leading to highly ordered structures, where multiple imine bonds connect the organic linkers and nodes to form a well-defined cage structure. This self-correcting mechanism makes imine-based cages particularly attractive for developing new cage architectures and has contributed to their widespread study in the field.

Boronic ester cages are another important class, characterized by their reversible boronic ester bonds and remarkable stability in non-aqueous conditions. Their unique chemical nature allows for post-synthetic modification, enabling the fine-tuning of cage properties after initial synthesis. This adaptability makes them valuable for applications requiring specific chemical functionalities, particularly in conditions where imine bonds are unstable.

A third major category includes alkyne-based cages, which feature irreversible acetylene linkages that provide enhanced structural rigidity. The strong covalent bonds in these structures result in high thermal stability, making them suitable for applications under demanding conditions. Their rigid framework ensures consistent cavity size and shape, making them particularly valuable for selective molecular recognition applications where structural integrity is crucial.

=== Structural classification ===
Beyond chemical composition, cages are also classified based on their structural characteristics. Shape-persistent cages maintain fixed conformations due to their rigid building blocks and strong covalent bonds, providing stable and predictable cavity environments. In contrast, flexible cages exhibit dynamic structures that can adapt to guest molecules through conformational changes, allowing for responsive host-guest interactions. This flexibility can be advantageous in applications requiring adaptive binding, such as selective molecular capture under varying conditions. Some systems even form hierarchical assemblies, creating cage-of-cage structures with complex internal architectures that can provide multiple distinct environments for guest molecules or cascade reactions.

=== Size-based classification ===
The classification of cages by cavity size provides practical guidance for applications and directly relates to their synthetic components and geometry. Small cages (< 1 nm internal diameter) are typically constructed from compact building blocks and feature tight binding pockets suitable for gas molecule separation and storage, particularly for gases like CO_{2} and CH_{4}. Medium cages (1-2 nm) represent the most versatile category, finding applications in selective molecular recognition and catalysis due to their ability to accommodate a wide range of organic molecules and maintain specific chemical environments. Large cages (> 2 nm), often synthesized using extended linear components or through hierarchical assembly, can accommodate bigger guest molecules such as proteins or large organic compounds, making them valuable for applications in drug delivery and enzyme encapsulation. The relationship between cage size and function has been extensively studied, revealing optimal size ranges for specific applications and guiding the design of new cage systems.

== Properties ==
=== Chemical ===
The functional groups in cages retain the chemical properties exhibited by small molecular analogues. This reactivity could be coupled to host-guest behavior. Examples:

- Imine-based cages aressusceptible to hydrolysis, which could be exploited for controlled release applications.
- boronic ester groups, which are known to bind diols could be used to recognize sugar analytes.
- Post-synthetic modification of cage structures is also possible.

=== Physical ===
Organic molecular cages exhibit permanent porosity in both solution and solid state. Typical surface areas range from 500 to 3000 m²/g, with pore volumes varying based on cage geometry. Most organic cages demonstrate high thermal stability up to 300 °C.

Solubility represents another key physical property, with most cages showing good solubility in common organic solvents. This solution processability enables their incorporation into membranes and composite materials. The mechanical properties of cage crystals depend on packing arrangements and intermolecular interactions. While individual cage molecules are robust due to their covalent nature, crystal mechanical properties can range from brittle to flexible depending on intermolecular forces. Shape persistence varies with cage structure, affecting their stability and guest binding properties.

== Synthesis ==
Covalent Organic Frameworks (COFs) have also been used to form cage architectures and in one such example Schiff base cyclization was used to form the macromolecular cage molecule. In this synthesis 1,3,5-triformylbenzene and (R,R)-(1,2)-diphenylethylenediamine undergo cycloimination in dichloromethane with trifluoroacetic acid as a catalyst to form a COF cage molecule. Macrocyclizations have also been employed to form peptoid based macromolecular cages, the specific methodology utilizes a one pot synthesis to form steroid-aryl hybrid cages using two- and three-fold Ugi type macrocyclization reactions.

Dynamic covalent chemistry enables the formation of thermodynamically stable cage structures through reversible bond formation. The formation of imine bonds through the reaction between aldehyde and amine groups represents a fundamental example of this chemistry. This reversible nature allows for continuous bond breaking and reforming during synthesis, enabling error correction and driving the system toward the most thermodynamically stable products. The dynamic nature of these reactions is particularly crucial in cage synthesis for several reasons. The ability to self-correct defects during formation ensures the production of highly ordered structures with minimal imperfections. The formation of thermodynamically favored products leads to stable and well-defined cage architectures that can maintain their structural integrity under various conditions. Furthermore, the reaction conditions can be carefully controlled for desired product distribution, allowing for selective synthesis of desired cage structures. This dynamic character also enables template-directed synthesis, where specific molecular templates can guide the assembly process toward predetermined architectures.

Both experimentally and computationally, various synthetic approaches have been developed to control cage formation and optimize yields. The choice of synthetic strategy significantly influences the final cage structure, purity, and scalability of the synthesis. Strategic synthetic approaches range from simple one-pot reactions to sophisticated template-directed methods, each offering distinct advantages.

=== One-Pot Synthesis ===
One-pot reactions involve combining all reactants simultaneously under appropriate conditions. This straightforward approach has proven successful for many simpler cage structures, particularly those formed through imine condensation. The success of one-pot synthesis often depends on the reversible nature of bond formation, allowing the system to self-correct and converge on the thermodynamically favored product. The reaction conditions, such as temperature, solvent choice, and concentration, play crucial roles in determining the outcome. For example, in imine cage synthesis, polar aprotic solvents like dichloromethane or chloroform are often preferred as they facilitate imine formation while allowing the removal of water byproduct. Additionally, techniques such as slow addition of components or temperature control can be employed to enhance selectivity towards the desired cage product.

=== Stepwise Assembly ===
More complex cage architectures often require stepwise assembly strategies. This approach involves the systematic construction of cage fragments followed by their controlled combination into the final structure. While more time-consuming, stepwise assembly offers greater control over the final product and is particularly useful for asymmetric cage structures. The key advantage of this method lies in its ability to isolate and characterize intermediate products, ensuring the quality of each synthetic step. For instance, in the synthesis of large cages, building blocks can be first combined into smaller sub-cages or fragments, which are then purified before final assembly. This strategy is particularly valuable when working with expensive or sophisticated building blocks, as it minimizes material waste and allows for optimization of each step.

=== Template-Directed Synthesis ===
Template-directed methods employ molecular templates to guide cage formation around a specific guest molecule. This approach can enhance selectivity and yield while providing control over cage size and shape. The template can either be removed post-synthesis or remain as a functional component of the final structure. The choice of template is crucial and depends on several factors including size compatibility, chemical affinity, and reversible binding capability. Common templates include metal ions, organic molecules, and solvent molecules. The template effect can operate through various mechanisms, such as geometric pre-organization of building blocks, electronic effects, or hydrogen bonding interactions. After cage formation, template removal strategies must be carefully considered to maintain the integrity of the cage structure.

== Characterization ==
The structural analysis of organic molecular cages requires a comprehensive suite of analytical techniques. Both 2D chemical structures and 3D physical arrangements are crucial for understanding cage architecture. These complementary structural representations serve different purposes: the 2D chemical structure provides connectivity information while the 3D ball-and-stick model reveals the spatial arrangement and actual cavity formation. This multi-faceted visualization is essential for understanding the relationship between molecular design and functional properties. The characterization process usually involves multiple complementary methods to fully understand the cage structure and properties.

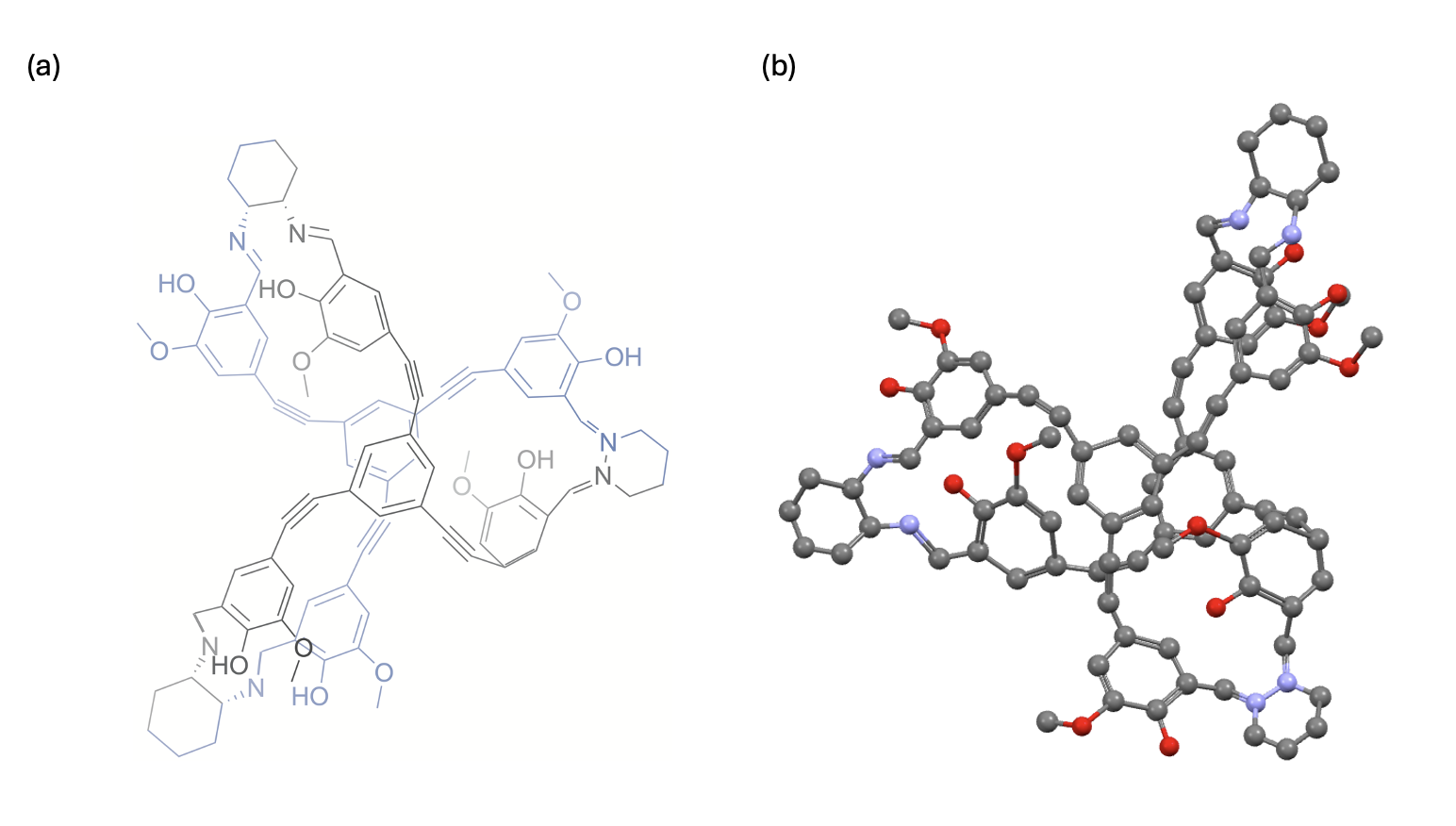
Molecular structure of a salen-based cage compound shown as: (a) 2D chemical structure, and (b) 3D ball-and-stick model representation

=== Single-Crystal X-ray Diffraction ===
Single-crystal X-ray diffraction serves as the definitive method for determining atomic-level structure of organic cages. This technique provides precise information about spatial arrangements of atoms, revealing exact bond lengths, angles, and the three-dimensional architecture of the cage framework. Critical structural features such as cavity dimensions, shape, and packing arrangements in the solid state can be determined with high accuracy.

=== Nuclear Magnetic Resonance Spectroscopy ===
NMR spectroscopy plays a crucial role in characterizing cage formation and dynamics in solution. Solution-state NMR allows researchers to monitor reaction progress and confirm structural features through chemical shift analysis and coupling patterns. Two-dimensional NMR techniques help establish connectivity patterns and verify the successful formation of key structural features. This solution-phase characterization complements solid-state analysis by providing insight into the cage's behavior under practical application conditions.

=== Mass Spectrometry ===
Mass spectrometry confirms molecular mass and provides insights into cage assembly processes. High-resolution mass spectrometry precisely determines the molecular weight of completed cages and can identify reaction intermediates during synthesis. The technique is particularly valuable for large cage structures where multiple charge states may be observed. Tandem mass spectrometry reveals fragmentation patterns that confirm structural assignments and can provide information about the strength of various bonds within the cage framework. Modern ionization techniques enable the study of host-guest complexes, offering insights into molecular recognition properties.

=== Porosity Measurements and Surface Analysis ===
Gas sorption analysis provides crucial information about the porosity and surface properties of organic molecular cages. Nitrogen adsorption-desorption isotherms determine surface area, pore volume, and pore size distribution. BET surface area measurements typically reveal values ranging from 500 to 3000 m²/g, depending on cage structure. The analysis of adsorption isotherms also provides insights into pore accessibility and connectivity. Carbon dioxide and hydrogen adsorption measurements evaluate potential applications in gas storage and separation.

=== Thermal Analysis ===
Thermogravimetric analysis (TGA) and differential scanning calorimetry (DSC) assess the thermal stability and phase behavior of cage compounds. TGA reveals decomposition temperatures and solvent loss patterns, while DSC identifies phase transitions and structural changes. These techniques are particularly important for evaluating cage stability under application conditions. Many organic cages show remarkable thermal stability up to 300 °C, though this varies significantly with chemical composition.

== Potential Applications ==
=== Molecular Separations ===
The well-defined pore structure of organic cages enables selective molecular separations. Molecular cages can discriminate between molecules based on size, shape, and chemical affinity. Gas separation represents a major application, where cages are incorporated into mixed-matrix membranes for selective gas transport. Studies have demonstrated effective separation of CO_{2}/N_{2}, CO_{2}/CH_{4}, and other industrially relevant gas mixtures. The uniform pore size and chemical environment ensure consistent separation performance. In liquid-phase separations, organic cages show promise for challenging molecular separations. Their solution processability enables incorporation into chromatographic stationary phases. The intrinsic chirality of some cage structures allows for enantioselective separations of racemic mixtures, achieving high separation factors for pharmaceutical and fine chemical applications.

=== Host-Guest Chemistry and Sensing ===
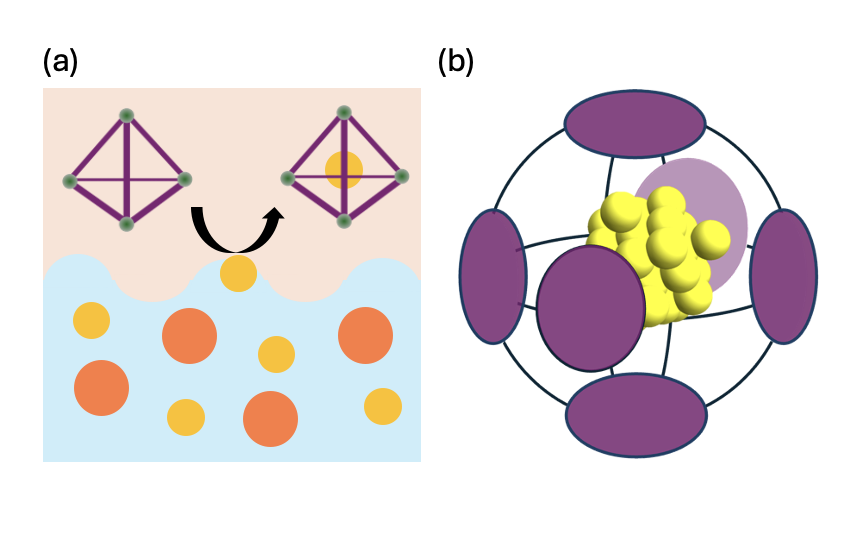
Molecular cage applications: (a) selective molecular separation (b) encapsulation of guest molecules

Organic cages function as molecular containers through specific host-guest interactions. The defined cavity can encapsulate guest molecules of appropriate size and chemical compatibility. The binding process often induces measurable changes in cage properties, enabling their use as molecular sensors. Selective binding of specific analytes can trigger optical, electronic, or structural responses that provide detection signals. These features enable applications in environmental monitoring and chemical detection. The host-guest chemistry extends to selective capture of environmental pollutants and valuable chemicals. The tunable cavity size and surface chemistry allow targeting specific molecules, while some cages demonstrate stimuli-responsive guest release for controlled delivery applications.

=== Catalysis ===
Organic cages act as nano reactors for catalytic transformations. The confined environment enhances reaction rates and selectivity through concentration effects in the cavity, specific orientation of reactants, stabilization of transition states, and control over product distribution. The well-defined cavity creates a unique microenvironment that can accelerate reactions and influence product selectivity. Asymmetric catalysis benefits from chiral cage environments, enabling stereoselective transformations. The catalytic activity can be tuned through modification of cage structure and functionalization of the cavity interior. Integration of catalytic sites within the cage framework allows for size-selective catalysis, where only appropriately sized substrates can access the active sites.

=== Emerging Applications ===
Recent developments have expanded the applications of organic molecular cages into new areas. Energy storage and conversion applications utilize cages as components in battery electrolytes and fuel cells. In environmental applications, cages demonstrate the potential for carbon capture and water purification through selective molecular binding.

Biological applications represent another growing field. The biocompatibility of certain cage structures enables their use in drug delivery systems. Some cages can encapsulate and protect therapeutic molecules, releasing them under specific physiological conditions. Additionally, enzyme-mimetic cages catalyze biological transformations in artificial systems.

Smart materials incorporating organic cages show stimuli-responsive behavior. These materials change properties in response to external stimuli such as light, temperature, or chemical signals. Applications include switchable membranes and responsive sensing systems.

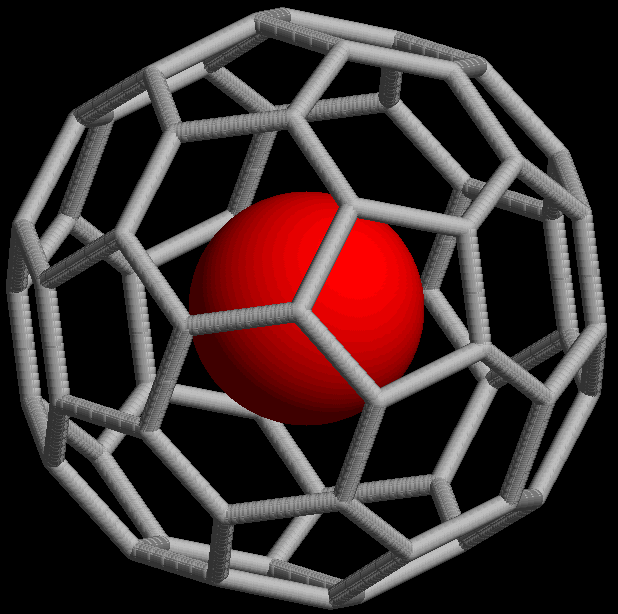
Endohedral fullerene
