= Committee to Defend America by Aiding the Allies =

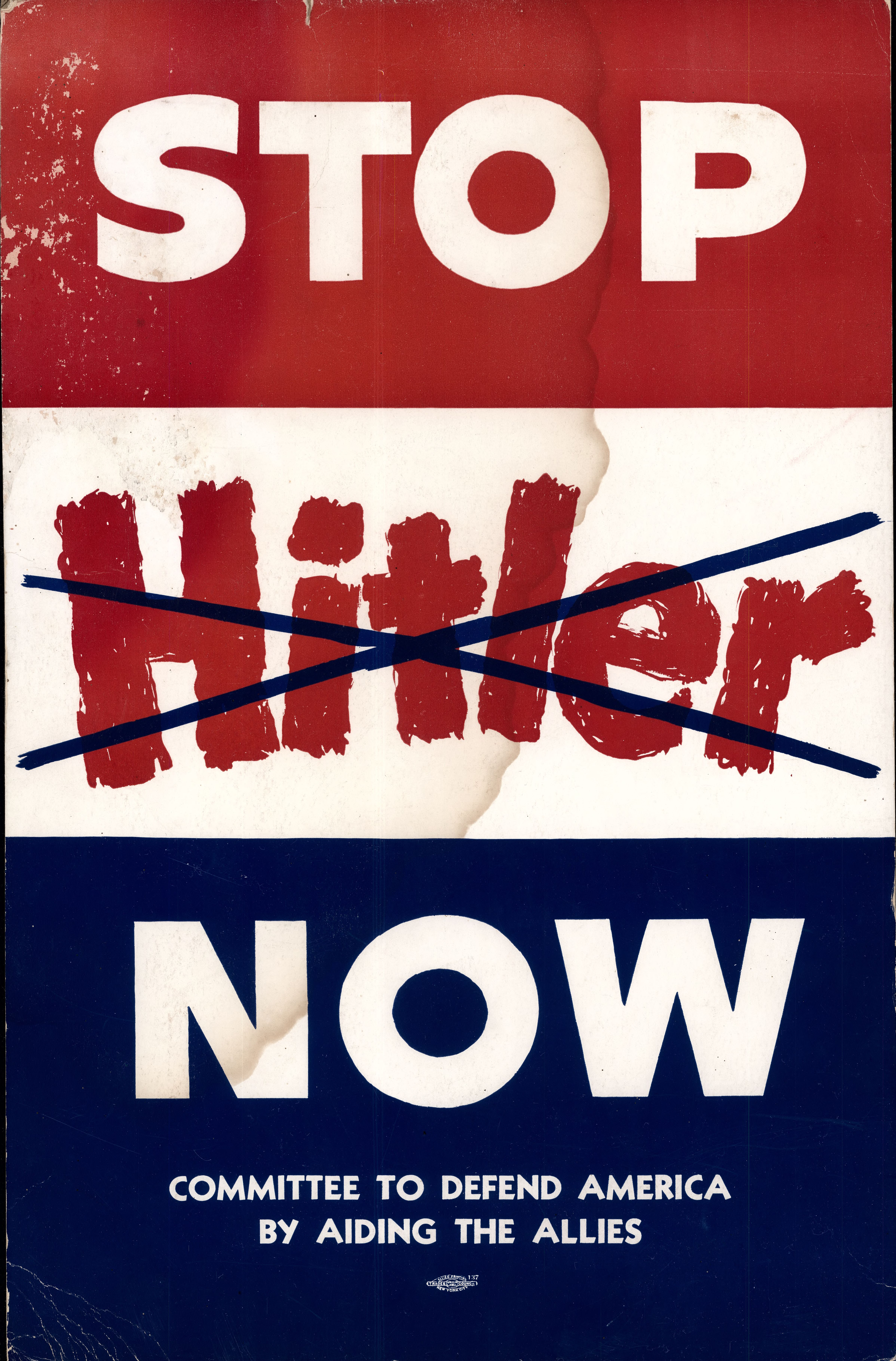
Stop Hitler Now poster

The Committee to Defend America by Aiding the Allies (CDAAA) was an American mass movement and political action group formed in May 1940. Also known as the White Committee, its leader until January 1941 was William Allen White. Other important members included Clark Eichelberger and Dean Acheson. The CDAAA shared its leadership with the dissolved Non-Partisan Committee for Peace through Revision of the Neutrality Law (NPC), which was also chaired by White and directed by Eichelberger. Additionally, the CDAAA used ex-NPC offices in the League of Nations building at 8 W. 40th Street in New York City, as their central base. This has drawn commentators to regard the CDAAA as the successor to the NPC.

The primary objective of the CDAAA was to persuade the United States government to support pro-British policies against Nazi Germany, which was winning the war in Europe. This included economic and material support through the Destroyer-for-Bases Agreement and the Lend-Lease policy. The CDAAA, however, advocated against the declaration of war against Germany or any other belligerent nations until the Japanese attack on Pearl Harbor.

== Organization and membership ==
Unlike other pro-intervention groups like the NPC and Committee for Non-Participation in Japanese Aggression (ACNPJA), the CDAAA actively incorporated the public into committees. As a result, 300 self-financed, self-controlled local units had been created across America by 1 July 1940. This improved the mobilization of its membership, which was especially significant considering its reliance on its members for outreach work. For example, volunteers from the Minneapolis unit sent out thousands of mimeographed letters, pamphlets, "V for Victory" stickers, "Stop Hitler" matches and aid-to-Britain Christmas cards during the war to gather funding and draw support for intervention on behalf of the Allies. However, while their geographic coverage was broad, the CDAAA lacked depth in various U.S. States: while Massachusetts had 137 chapters in April 1941, Idaho only had one.

The CDAAA used a "qualitative approach" when structuring their organization to counter the wealthy, white male predominance of their leadership and target groups that were divided on the issue of U.S. intervention into World War Two. This meant separating the organization into four distinct groups: the youth division, the college division, the women's division, and the labor division.

By the end of October 1940 the CDAAA had one million members. By the time the CDAAA disbanded on December 11, 1941 it had 450 chapters and at least 250,000 members.

=== Women and the CDAAA ===
Women were involved with the CDAAA from the beginning. By May 29, 1940 the committee had 354 sponsors of whom 47 were women (13% of the total). A national committee list that was dated to January 16, 1941 showed 603 members with 95 being women or 16%. Prominent women in the organization included Freda Kirchwey and Esther Caukin Brunauer.

=== Interaction with African-American communities ===
The committee targeted African-Americans as a group to cultivate support, which helped diversify their membership. They released pamphlets such as "Colored People Have a Stake in the War" to relate pro-Allied intervention to entice their membership. High-profile African-Americans, such as Ralph Bunche—who, from 1941, held a position in the Office of Strategic Services (OSS)—were included in their national committee.

The CDAAA campaigned for anti-discriminatory legislation that coincided with their pro-interventionist stance. For example, in response to Roosevelt's Executive Order 8802, the CDAAA published a press release that called for an extension of the ban on racist employment practices to the armed services, as "anti-Negro discrimination was inconsistent with the democratic principles which the American people as a whole are being called upon to defend."

However, the CDAAA's segregation of African-American membership caused resentment within their communities; when A. Philip Randolph joined the CDAAA, he argued that the formation of a separate "Negro-branch" undermined the independence of African-American organizations and "savour[ed] jim-crowism".

== Aims and methods ==
The primary concern of the CDAAA was to ensure America's national security during the Second World War. It believed the best strategy for this was the provision of economic and material support to its allies, especially Britain's campaign against Nazi Germany. In a statement in July 1940, White made this position clear; he argued that Britain was America's first line of defence and that, if Britain were not supported, the United States would become "the subject of an envy that would lead to attack." In spite of their interventionist advocacy, the CDAAA refused to further their aims towards a declaration of war against the Axis Powers.

=== Involvement in the 1940 Destroyer-for-Bases Exchange ===
In May 1940, Winston Churchill requested the purchase of old U.S.Navy Destroyers to bolster the British Royal Navy. President Franklin D. Roosevelt was hesitant to agree because of the Neutrality Acts, which banned the shipment or sale of arms from the U.S. to any combatant nation, and the existing anti-interventionist sentiment that drove the passage of these reforms. Furthermore, this request coincided with election year, which made Roosevelt increasingly sensitive to public opinion.

In response, the CDAAA campaigned to drive popular support for the selling of military resources to Britain. Robert Sherwood penned the provocative newspaper advertisement "Stop Hitler Now", published on 10 June 1940, which urged the American people to ask their president and congressional representatives to support maximum aid to the Allies. He argued that the conquest of Europe would leave America "alone in a barbaric world." This effort was supported by the Pershing Address on 4 August 1940, which the CDAAA organised with co-operation with the Century Group. John J. Pershing's comments gained significant traction from the press, with the New York Herald Tribune printing the story as its front-page and the New York Times publishing it under the headline, "Pershing Warns U.S. to Aid Britain by Sending 50 Destroyers Now."

Alongside popular mobilisation, the CDAAA pursued the legitimisation of this suggested trade by finding legal grounding from existing laws. On 11 August 1940, a document named "No Legal Bar Seen to Transfer of Destroyers" was published, which suggested that no further consent was required from Congress for Roosevelt to conduct the selling of Navy Destroyers to Britain. This was signed by Charles C. Burlingham of the New York Bar, former solicitor general Thomas D. Thatcher, former Federal Trade Commission member George Rublee, and Dean Acheson.

In the build-up to the 1940 election, the CDAAA worked to ensure that no partisan debate arose in regard to the degree of American intervention into World War Two. This was facilitated by their nonpartisan position, which allowed them to endorse both Roosevelt and Wendel Willkie, who were both pro-interventionists. When Willkie was announced as the Republican candidate on 17 August, he didn't explicitly refer to the destroyers but did concede that the loss of the British fleet would "greatly weaken our defense" and an Atlantic dominated by Germany would be “a calamity.”

On September 3, 1940, in response to popular and legal opinion swinging into his favor, Roosevelt announced the exchange of 50 U.S.warship in return for the right to lease naval and air bases in eight different British territories.

This was a great success for the CDAAA. Following the election, on November 26, 1940, the CDAAA released a new statement of policy to further their aims. It included support for "the maintenance of the lifeline between Great Britain and the United States," the "assumption by Congress of greater responsibility with the President," and the repeal of "restrictive legislation."

=== Involvement in Lend-Lease (1941) ===
Similar to in 1940, the CDAAA used popular pressure to exert influence over the U.S. government in favor of Lend-Lease. This was primarily directed towards its success in Congress, which they now had direct access to due to the role of their new leader, Ernest Gibson Jr., as Senator of Vermont. In 1941, Gibson presented their position in a statement of support for the bill before the House Committee on Foreign Affairs. Previous to this, he had endorsed the bill in spite of its implications on Presidential power, stating that "only large powers will serve to meet the growing threat to our safety."

Meanwhile, Eichelberger used a radio debate against 1936 Republican presidential nominee Alf Landon to appeal for bipartisan support for the bill.

The CDAAA, again, provided legal support for the Lend-Lease bill. The group released a statement by George Rublee, one of the signatories of the New York Times letter of the previous August, that specifically opposed the dictatorship charges made in the minority report of the House Foreign Affairs Committee. It states that "the Bill of Rights will still operate. This measure does not add to the powers the President already has as Commander in Chief of the Nation’s armed forces, and under which powers he could get us into war today, if he wanted to.”

This help facilitated the passage of the Lend-Lease bill through Congress, which was signed into law by Roosevelt on 11 March 1941. As the passage of the Lend-Lease bill ensured maximum aid to the Allies, the CDAAA had largely fulfilled its objectives of obtaining Allied support short of war.

== Opposition ==
The CDAAA competed for American sympathy with the America First Committee. Created on 4 September 1940, it was the main pressure group supporting complete neutrality and non-intervention.

On occasion, the CDAAA was accused of being a British front by its rivals. After the release of the “Stop Hitler Now” advertisement, Democratic West Virginia senator Rush Holt claimed that its funding was sourced from industrialists, international lawyers, international bankers and directors of corporations in Britain. This painted the committee as a tool of big business and, thus, drove the CDAAA to provide the Department of State with details of those who had contributed financially to the advertisement’s publication and reprinting. This ensured that the “Stop Hitler Now” piece had been funded by “100% American sources.”

In September 1941, the CDAAA were criticized for having close British connections in a St. Louis Post-Dispatch article by Charles Ross. The story accused committee member John L. Balderson of frequent contact with the British embassy, Senator Holt highlighted Balderston’s role, stating that he “is not interested in preserving America but is directly under the British Ministry of Information.” As a result, Balderson was forced to step back from the CDAAA.

When the No Foreign War Committee organized in mid-December 1940, its chair, Verne Marshall, said its mission was to counter the "propaganda" of the CDAAA, which had, he said, "the same public psychology as that which was carefully created during the war period preceding our declaration of hostilities in April 1917." He said his group aimed to force the CDAAA to provide details "specific, exact, and unequivocal" of what it meant when it called for "steps short of war."

== White's resignation ==
In late 1940, there were reports of differences of opinion in the group's leadership after White made remarks that some thought to be at odds with the CDAAA program. He said: "The only reason in God's world I am in this organization is to keep the country out of war.... If I were making a motto for the Committee it would be 'The Yanks Are Not Coming.'"

New York City Mayor Fiorello LaGuardia wrote White a letter of protest, accusing him of "doing a Laval." That referred to French Prime Minister Pierre Laval, the principal figure in France's Vichy government's co-operation with Germany. Herbert Bayard Swope supported the mayor and said that the organization as a whole, despite what White had said, takes as its priority "all possible aid to Britain and the allies." Meanwhile, the national director denied any differences and said that everyone in the group supported Lend-Lease and opposed both appeasement and a negotiated peace. He quoted and endorsed White's statement: "appeasement is treason to democracy."

The America First Committee capitalised upon these differences. Robert E. Wood suggested White’s statement offered a basis for national unity and that the remarks "essential[ly] agreement with our position."

On 2 January 1941, White resigned as chairman of the CDAAA. He cited his age as his reason for resigning.

Ernest W. Gibson Jr. succeeded White as national chairman in January 1941.

== Change to Campaign to Defend America and decline ==
After Germany invaded the Soviet Union in June 1941, the CDAAA dropped "by Aiding the Allies" from their name and became simply the Committee to Defend America (CDA). That was caused by the strong aversion from committee members to embracing Joseph Stalin and communism, which were now part of the Allied forces against the Axis Powers. The CDA maintained its official anti-communist stance in spite of American cooperation with the Soviets.

The Japanese attack on Pearl Harbor in December 1941 effectively brought an end to the CDA by bringing America into war. It also marked the dissolution of the America First Committee.

In January 1942, the CDA merged with the Council for Democracy to form Citizens for Victory: To Win the War, To Win the Peace. The combined organization then dissolved in October 1942, which marked the official cessation of the CDAAA.
