= Specific surface area =

Total surface of a finely divided solid per unit of mass

Scratches, represented by triangular-shaped grooves, make the surface area greater.

Specific surface area (SSA) is a property of solids defined as the total surface area (SA) of a material per unit mass, (with units of m^{2}/kg or m^{2}/g). Alternatively, it may be defined as SA per solid or bulk volume (units of m^{2}/m^{3} or m^{−1}).

It is a physical value that can be used to determine the type and properties of a material (e.g. soil or snow). It has a particular importance for adsorption, heterogeneous catalysis, and reactions on surfaces.

== Measurement ==
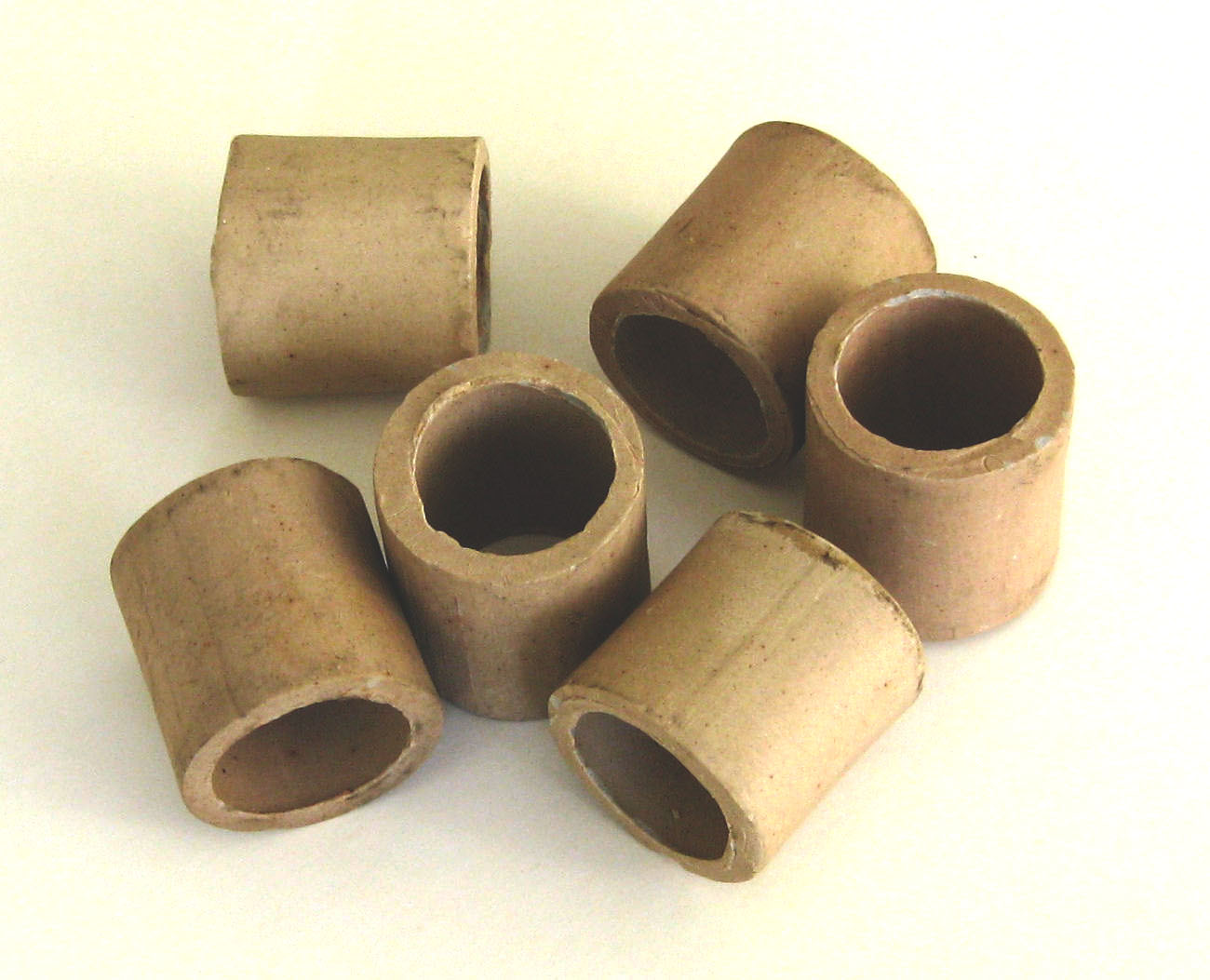
Ceramic Raschig rings...

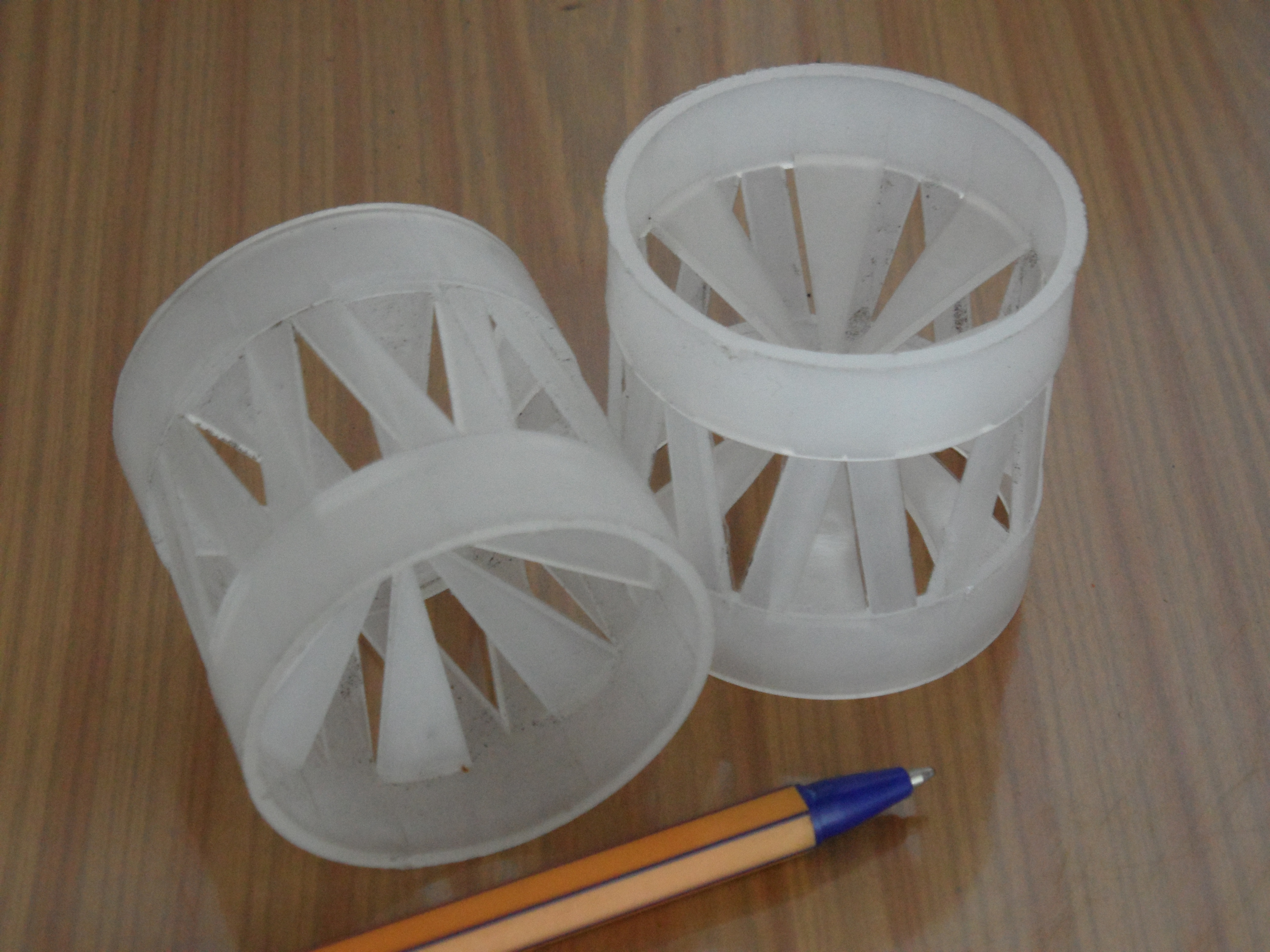
...and plastic Białecki rings of increased SSA

Values obtained for specific surface area depend on the method of measurement. In adsorption based methods, the size of the adsorbate molecule (the probe molecule), the exposed crystallographic planes at the surface and measurement temperature all affect the obtained specific surface area. For this reason, in addition to the most commonly used Brunauer–Emmett–Teller (N_{2}-BET) adsorption method, several techniques have been developed to measure the specific surface area of particulate materials at ambient temperatures and at controllable scales, including methylene blue (MB) staining, ethylene glycol monoethyl ether (EGME) adsorption, electrokinetic analysis of complex-ion adsorption and a Protein Retention (PR) method. A number of international standards exist for the measurement of specific surface area, including ISO standard 9277.

=== Calculation ===
The SSA can be simply calculated from a particle size distribution, making some assumption about the particle shape. This method, however, fails to account for surface associated with the surface texture of the particles.

=== Adsorption ===
The SSA can be measured by adsorption using the BET isotherm. This has the advantage of measuring the surface of fine structures and deep texture on the particles. However, the results can differ markedly depending on the substance adsorbed. The BET theory has inherent limitations but has the advantage to be simple and to yield adequate relative answers when the solids are chemically similar. In relatively rare cases, more complicated models based on thermodynamic approaches, or even quantum chemistry, may be applied to improve the consistency of the results, but at the cost of much more complex calculations requiring advanced knowledge and a good understanding from the operator.

=== Gas permeability ===
This depends upon a relationship between the specific surface area and the resistance to gas-flow of a porous bed of powder. The method is simple and quick, and yields a result that often correlates well with the chemical reactivity of a powder. However, it fails to measure much of the deep surface texture.

Selected Materials with High Surface Areas
| Typical surface area (m^{2}/g) | Material | Application |
|---|---|---|
| 7140 | Metal–organic framework | gas absorption |
| 900 | Faujasite | catalyst |
| 500–3000 | activated carbon | gas and solute absorption |
| 200 | alumina | catalyst support |

== See also ==
- Surface-area-to-volume ratio
