= Twistane =

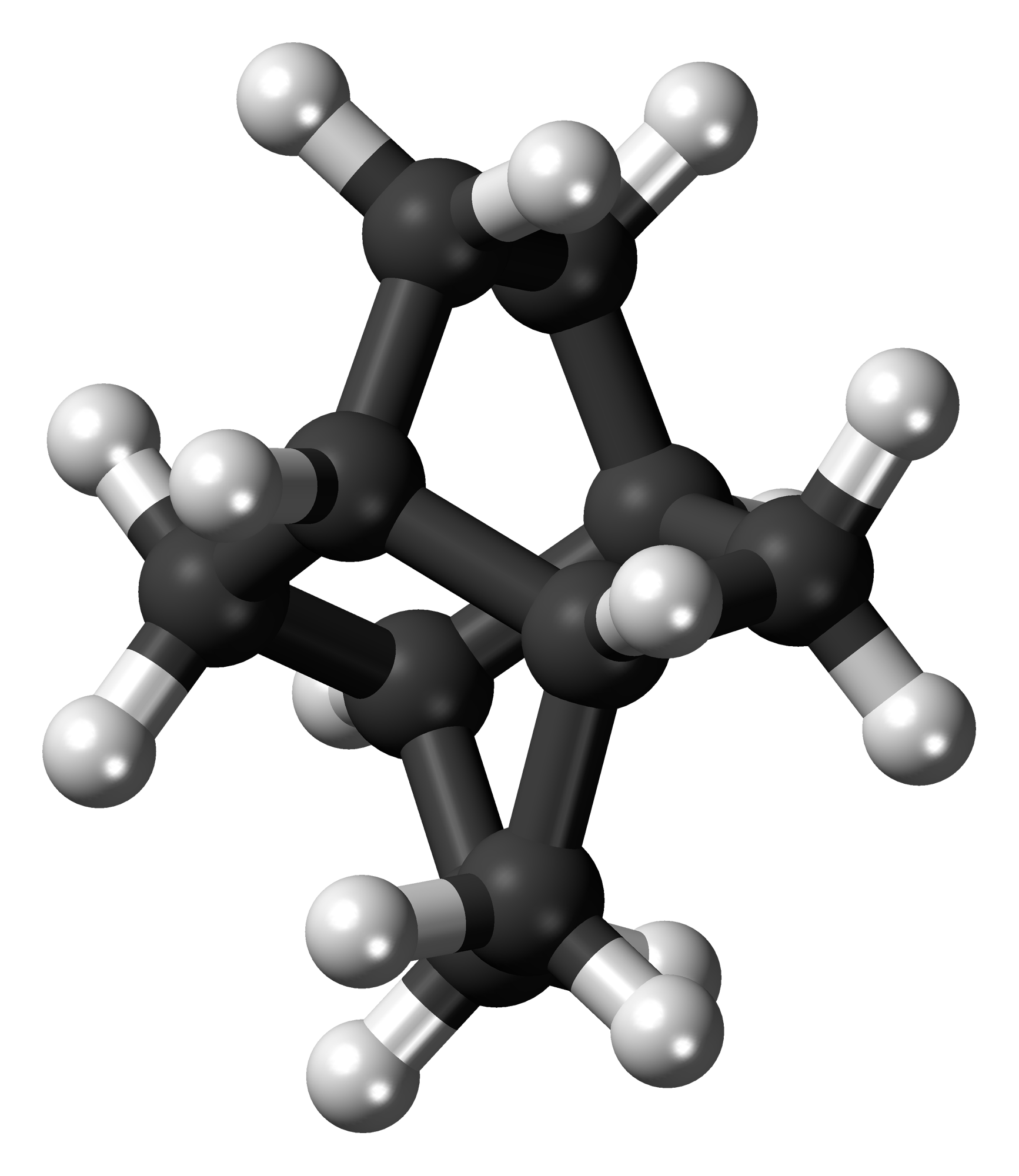

Names
- Preferred IUPAC name Tricyclo[4.4.0.0^{3,8}]decane

Identifiers
CAS Number	253-14-5; (−): 37165-27-8; (+): 21449-14-9
3D model (JSmol)	Interactive image
Beilstein Reference	1919499; 2232311
ChEBI	CHEBI:32904
ChemSpider	4574225; (−): 34984822; (+): 34984821
PubChem CID	5460768
UNII	4T296B0U5O
CompTox Dashboard (EPA)	DTXSID20420120
- InChI: InChI=1/C10H16/c1-2-8-6-9-3-4-10(8)5-7(1)9/h7-10H,1-6H2
- SMILES: C1CC2CC3CCC2CC13

Properties
Chemical formula	C_{10}H_{16}
Molar mass	136.238 g·mol^{−1}
Melting point	163 to 164.8 °C (325.4 to 328.6 °F; 436.1 to 437.9 K)

Structure
Coordination geometry	D_{2}
Dipole moment	0 D
- Except where otherwise noted, data are given for materials in their standard state (at 25 °C [77 °F], 100 kPa). verify (what is ?) Infobox references

Twistane (IUPAC name: tricyclo[4.4.0.0^{3,8}]decane) is an organic compound with the formula C_{10}H_{16}. It is a cycloalkane and an isomer of the simplest diamondoid, adamantane, and like adamantane, is not very volatile. Twistane was named for the way its rings are permanently forced into the cyclohexane conformation known as the "twist-boat". The compound was first reported by Whitlock in 1962.

== Synthesis ==
Twistane has been synthesized in a variety of ways. The original 1962 method was based on a bicyclo[2.2.2]octane framework, an approach that has seen substantial optimization since. An alternate approach from 1967 publication relied on an intramolecular aldol condensation of a cis-decalin ketol. It is formed when basketane is hydrogenated.

The twistane core also forms from sodium mesitolate and bromoisoprene.

== Symmetry ==
The only symmetry operation in twistane is rotation, and there exist three 2-fold axes as shown in the left picture. Thus the point group of twistane is D_{2}. Although twistane has four stereocenters, it only exists as two enantiomers. This is because it is symmetric along its C_{2} axis.

== Polytwistane ==
Polytwistane is a hypothetical polymer of fused twistane units awaiting actual synthesis.
