= Basketane =

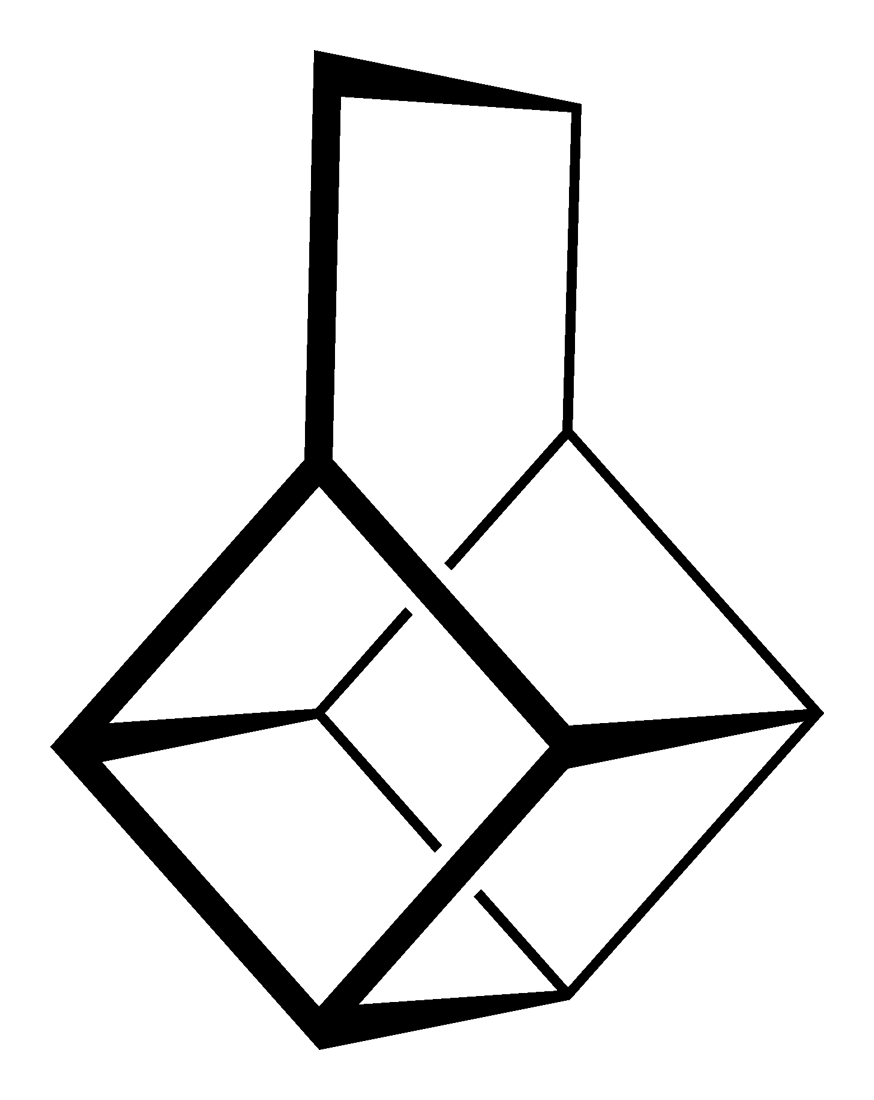

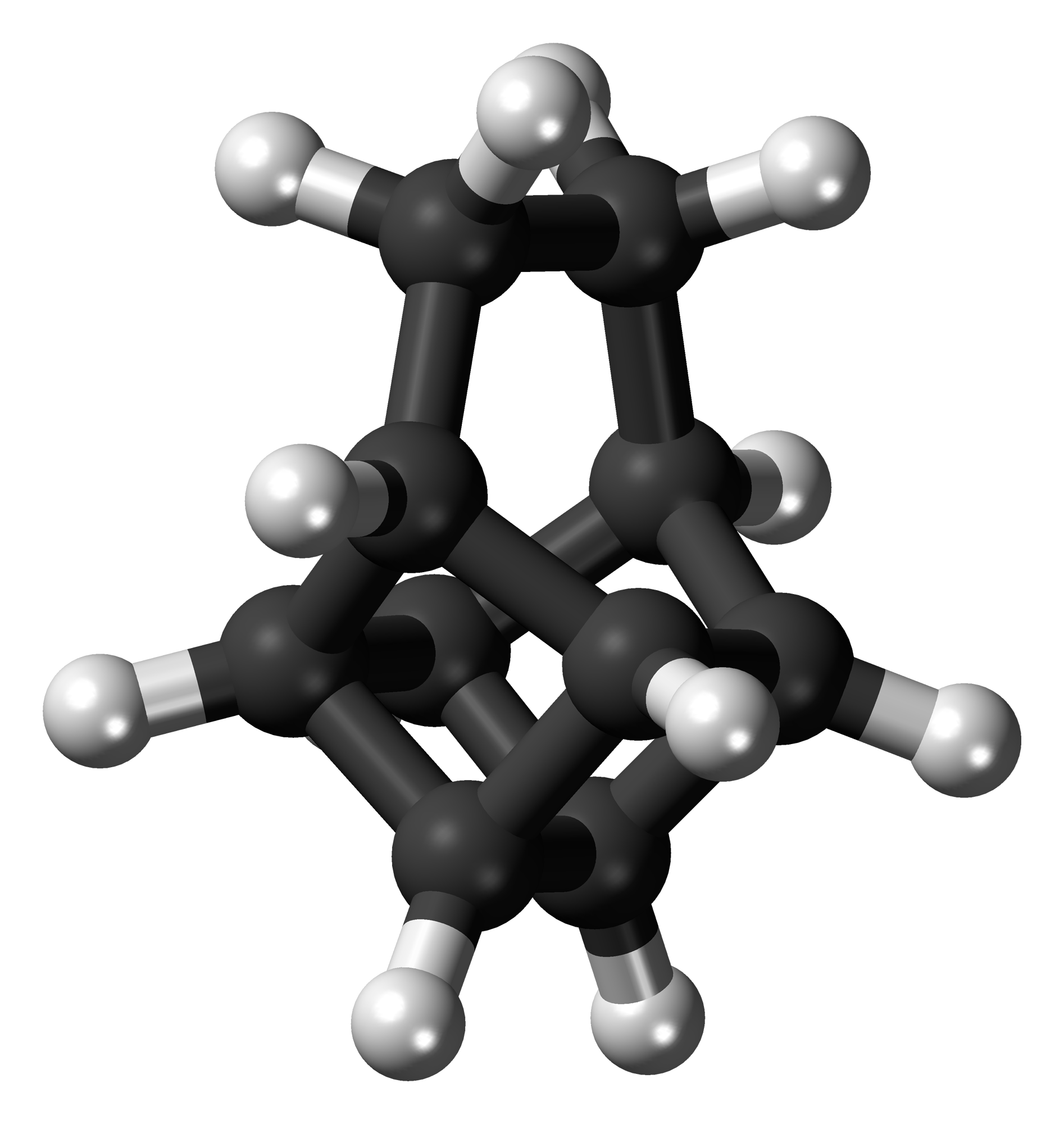

Names
- Preferred IUPAC name Pentacyclo[4.4.0.0^{2,5}.0^{3,8}.0^{4,7}]decane

Identifiers
CAS Number	5603-27-0
3D model (JSmol)	Interactive image
ChemSpider	16736517
PubChem CID	12496332
CompTox Dashboard (EPA)	DTXSID70891942
- InChI: InChI=1S/C10H12/c1-2-4-7-5-3(1)6-8(4)10(7)9(5)6/h3-10H,1-2H2 Key: QKWLQWFMFQOKET-UHFFFAOYSA-N; InChI=1/C10H12/c1-2-4-7-5-3(1)6-8(4)10(7)9(5)6/h3-10H,1-2H2 Key: QKWLQWFMFQOKET-UHFFFAOYAB
- SMILES: C2CC5C1C4C3C1C2C3C45

Properties
Chemical formula	C_{10}H_{12}
Molar mass	132.206 g·mol^{−1}
- Except where otherwise noted, data are given for materials in their standard state (at 25 °C [77 °F], 100 kPa). Infobox references

Basketane is a polycyclic alkane with the chemical formula C_{10}H_{12}. The name is taken from its structural similarity to a basket shape. Basketane was first synthesized in 1966 independently by Masamune and Dauben and Whalen.

== Nomenclature ==
Some compounds are named for objects seen in everyday life. Cubane, housane, and basketane were named accordingly.

== Synthesis ==
One synthesis of basketane begins with a Diels–Alder reaction between cyclooctatetraene (1) and maleic anhydride (2), giving the polycyclic anhydride 3, which photoisomerizes in acetone via an intramolecular cyclization to give 4 at a 40% yield. Hydrolysis of the anhydride followed by treatment with lead tetraacetate affords the unsaturated basketene (5), which is then hydrogenated to basketane (6).

An alternative synthetic route with better overall yield uses 1,4-benzoquinone and cyclohexa-1,3-diene as starting materials. 1,4-Benzoquinone (1) is first converted to 2,5-dibromo-1,4-benzoquinone (2), which reacts in a Diels–Alder reaction with cyclohexa-1,3-diene (3) to form the polycyclic diketone 4. This diketone photoisomerizes to 1,6-dibromopentacyclo[6.4.0.0^{3,6}.0^{4,12}.0^{5,9}]dodeca-2,7-dione (5), which undergoes a pseudo-Favorskii rearrangement in a 25% aqueous solution of sodium hydroxide, giving the dicarboxylic acid 6. The acid is decarboxylated with a modified Hunsdiecker reaction to a dibromide 7, which is reductively debrominated with tributyltin hydride to basketane (8) at a 11% yield relative to the starting material cyclohexa-1,3-diene.

A 1994 synthesis starts with homocubanone, a cubane derivative, forming basketane via the basketyl radical. The synthesis functions by forcing cubane rings to be opened up via structural strain to create the chemical bonds necessary for this rigid molecule. This method is known as ring expansion where one part of two conjoined ringed are opened and rearranged to remove barriers between the two ring systems.Cyclobutylmethyl radicals that rearrange and open into structures such as basketane and cubane are favorable rearrangements with free energy barriers around 0.3 kcal/mol.

== Properties and reactions ==
The C-C-C and H-C-C bond angles in basketane and several other cages deviate from 109.5 degrees, i.e., they are strained rings. The strain energy is reflected in high heat of combustion.

=== Metal-catalyzed rearrangements ===
Transition metals catalyze the valence isomerization of basketane and substituted derivatives. Silver perchlorate catalyzes its isomerization to the compound snoutane.

Other transition metals catalyze the formation of a snoutane derivative with a tricyclic diene. The ratio of the products depends on the nature of the catalyst used and the substitutions on the basketane.

Basketane absorbs an equivalent amount of hydrogen gas in the presence of palladium on carbon, After some initial confusion, it was shown that the C3-C4 bond is hydrogenolyzed to give the dihydrobasketane tetracyclo[4.4.0.0^{2,5}.0^{3,8}]decane. Further hydrogenation cleaves the C5-C6 bond to give the hydrocarbon twistane.

== See also ==
- Cubane
- List of chemical compounds with unusual names
