= Tydings Committee =

U.S investigation into charges by Joseph McCarthy

The Subcommittee on the Investigation of Loyalty of State Department Employees, more commonly referred to as the Tydings Committee, was a subcommittee authorized by S.Res. 231 in February 1950 to look into charges by Joseph R. McCarthy that he had a list of individuals who were known by the Secretary of State to be members of the Communist Party of the United States of America (CPUSA) yet who were still working in the State Department.

== Organization ==
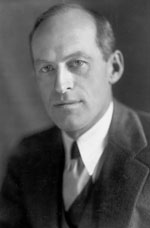
Senator Millard Tydings

The mandate of the committee was to conduct "a full and complete study and investigation as to whether persons who are disloyal to the United States are, or have been, employed by the Department of State."

The chairman of the subcommittee was Senator Millard Tydings, a Democrat from Maryland.

== History ==
On February 20, 1950, McCarthy had delivered a 5-hour speech to the Senate in which he presented the cases of 81 "loyalty risks" who he claimed were working for the State Department. McCarthy declined requests to disclose the actual names of the people on his list, and instead referred to them by "case numbers". It is widely accepted that most of McCarthy's cases were taken from the so-called "Lee list"—a report that had been compiled three years earlier for the House Appropriations Committee. Led by former FBI agent Robert E. Lee, the House investigators had been allowed to review the security clearance documents on State Department employees, and had determined that there were "incidents of inefficiencies" in the security reviews of 108 past and present employees.

The Lee list was also the source of McCarthy's famous list of 57 "cardcarrying Communists" in the State Department. In 1948, the State Department had informed the House that of the 108 cases flagged by Lee, 57 were still working for the department. This list included persons whom Lee had deemed security risks for a variety of reasons, such as marital infidelity or drunkenness, and all of them had been cleared by the State Department's review process.

In response to these allegations, the Tydings Committee hearings were held, opening on March 8, 1950, and lasting until July 17. At the hearings, McCarthy expanded on his original list of unnamed individuals and made charges against nine others whose names he made public: Dorothy Kenyon, Esther Brunauer, Haldore Hanson, Gustavo Duran, Owen Lattimore, Harlow Shapley, Frederick L. Schuman, John S. Service and Philip Jessup. Owen Lattimore became a particular focus of McCarthy's, who at one point described him as a "top Russian spy."

== Final report and reception ==
From its beginning, the Tydings Committee was marked by partisan infighting. Its final report, written by the Democratic majority, concluded that the individuals on McCarthy's list were neither Communists nor pro-communist, and said the State Department had an effective security program. Tydings labeled McCarthy's charges a "fraud and a hoax," and said that the result of McCarthy's actions was to "confuse and divide the American people[...] to a degree far beyond the hopes of the Communists themselves." Republicans responded in kind, with William Jenner stating that Tydings was guilty of "the most brazen whitewash of treasonable conspiracy in our history." The full Senate voted three times on whether to accept the report, and each time the voting was precisely divided along party lines.

The Republicans were sharply critical of the committee's report. Even McCarthy opponent Margaret Chase Smith said that the committee:

...made the fatal error of subjectively attempting to discredit McCarthy rather than objectively investigating and evaluating his charges.

An article in Time criticized the committee, saying the group "seemed more interested in belittling subversion than in pinning it down."

== Aftermath ==
Driven against Tydings due to his chairmanship of the committee, McCarthy successfully worked to unseat him in the 1950 Senate election in Maryland.
