= Thioketal =

Organosulfur compound of the form >C(S–)O– or >C(S–)2

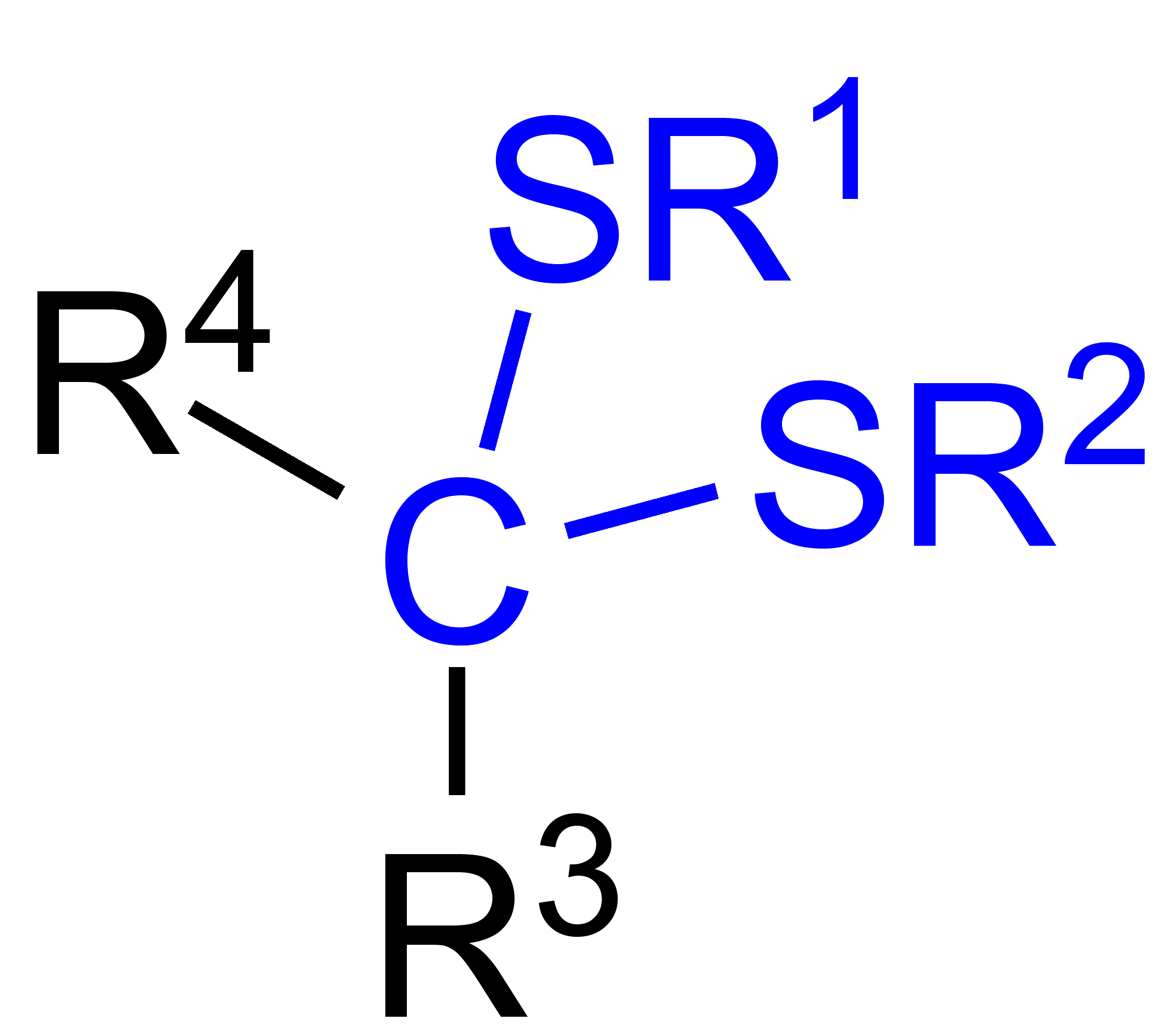
General chemical structure of a dithioketal

In organosulfur chemistry, a thioketal is the sulfur analogue of a ketal (R_{2}C(OR)_{2}), with one of the oxygen replaced by sulfur (as implied by the thio- prefix), giving the structure R_{2}C(SR)OR. A dithioketal has both oxygens replaced by sulfur (R_{2}C(SR)_{2}).

Thioketals can be obtained by reacting ketones (>C=O) or aldehydes (−CH=O) with thiols (−SH).

An oxidative cleavage mechanism has been proposed for dithioketals, which involves thioether oxidation, the formation of thionoiums, and hydrolysis, resulting in the formation of aldehyde and ketone products.

Thioketal moieties are found to be responsive to reactive oxygen species (ROS). In the presence of ROS, thioketals can be selectively cleaved. ROS successfully cleave heterobifunctional thioketal linkers, which have been found to have therapeutic potential, as they can produce ROS-responsive agents with two different functionalities.

Ketones can be reduced at neutral pH via conversion to thioketals; the thioketal prepared from the ketone can be easily reduced by catalytic hydrogenation using Raney nickel in a reaction known as the Mozingo reduction.

== See also ==
- Thioacetal
