= Clemmensen reduction =

Organic chemical reaction

Named after	Erik Christian Clemmensen
Reaction type	Organic redox reaction

Reaction
Ketone or Aldehyde
+
Zn(Hg)
+
HCl
↓
Reduction product

Conditions
Catalyst	+Δ

Identifiers
Organic Chemistry Portal	clemmensen-reduction
RSC ontology ID	RXNO:0000038

Clemmensen reduction is a chemical reaction described as a reduction of ketones or aldehydes to alkanes using zinc amalgam and concentrated hydrochloric acid (HCl). This reaction is named after Erik Christian Clemmensen, a Danish-American chemist.

Scheme 1: Reaction scheme of Clemmensen Reduction.

Clemmensen reduction conditions are particularly effective at reducing aryl-alkyl ketones, such as those formed in a Friedel-Crafts acylation. The two-step sequence of Friedel-Crafts acylation followed by Clemmensen reduction constitutes a classical strategy for the primary alkylation of arenes.

== Mechanism ==
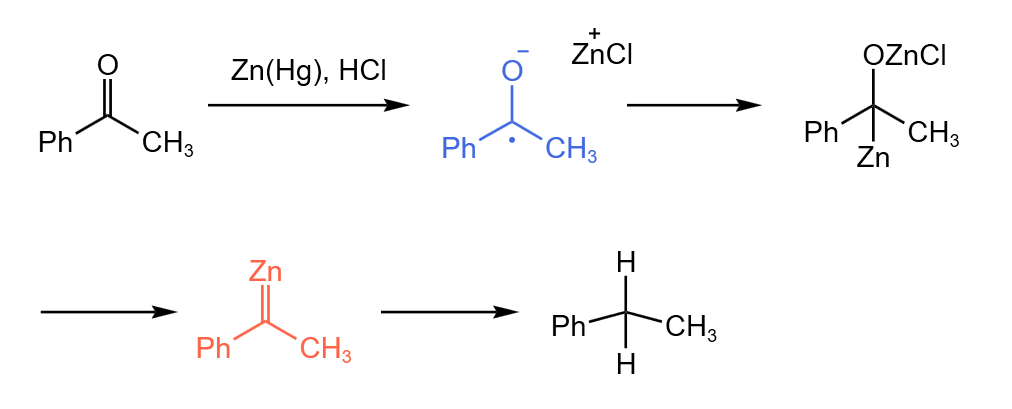
Scheme 2: A mechanism of Clemmensen reduction was proposed in 1975. The carbonyl is first converted to radical anion (shown as blue), then to zinc carbenoid (shown as red), and then reduced to alkane.

Despite the reaction being first discovered in 1914, the mechanism of the Clemmensen reduction remains obscure. Due to the heterogeneous nature of the reaction, mechanistic studies are difficult, and only a handful of studies have been disclosed. Mechanistic proposals generally invoke organozinc intermediates, sometimes including zinc carbenoids, either as discrete species or as organic fragments bound to the zinc metal surface. Brewster proposed the possibility of the reduction occurring at the metal surface. Depending on the constitution of the carbonyl compound or the acidity of the reaction, a carbon-metal or oxygen-metal bond can form after the compound attaches to the metal surface. Furthermore, Vedeja proposed a mechanism involving the formation of radical anion and zinc carbenoid, followed by reduction to alkane (as shown above). However, alcohol and carbanion are not believed to be intermediates, since exposing alcohol to Clemmensen conditions rarely affords the alkane product.

== Application ==
Highly symmetrical hydrocarbon compounds have attracted much interest due to their beautiful structure and potential applications, but the challenges in the synthesis persist. Suzuki et al. synthesized dibarrelane, a type of hydrocarbon compound, using Clemmensen reduction. They hypothesized that the secondary alcohol underwent an S_{N}1 reaction, forming a chloride. Then, an excess amount of zinc reduced the chloride. Importantly, the reaction effectively reduced the two ketones, alcohol, and the methoxycarbonyl group while avoiding any by-products, giving the product in high yield (61%).

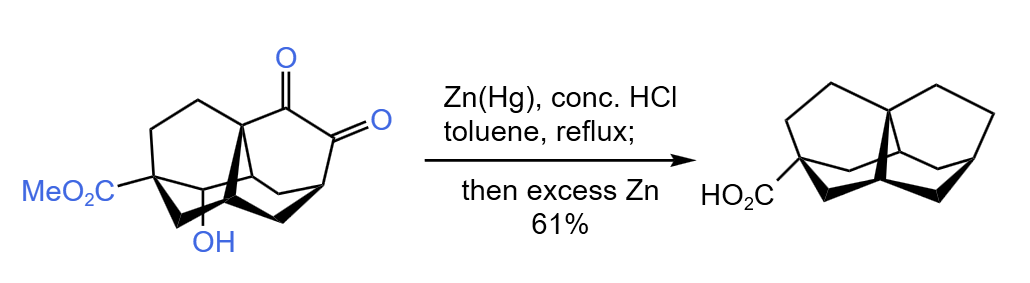
Scheme 3: The synthesis of Dibarrelane.

Clemmensen reduction is not particularly effective with aliphatic or cyclic ketones. A modified condition, involving activated zinc dust in an anhydrous-solution of hydrogen chloride in diethyl ether or acetic anhydride, results in a more effective reduction. The modified Clemmensen reduction allows for the selective deoxygenation of ketones in molecules that contain stable groups such as cyano, amido, acetoxy, and carboalkoxy. Yamamura et al. effectively reduced cholestane-3-one to cholestane using the modified Clemmensen condition and gave the product in high yield (~76%).

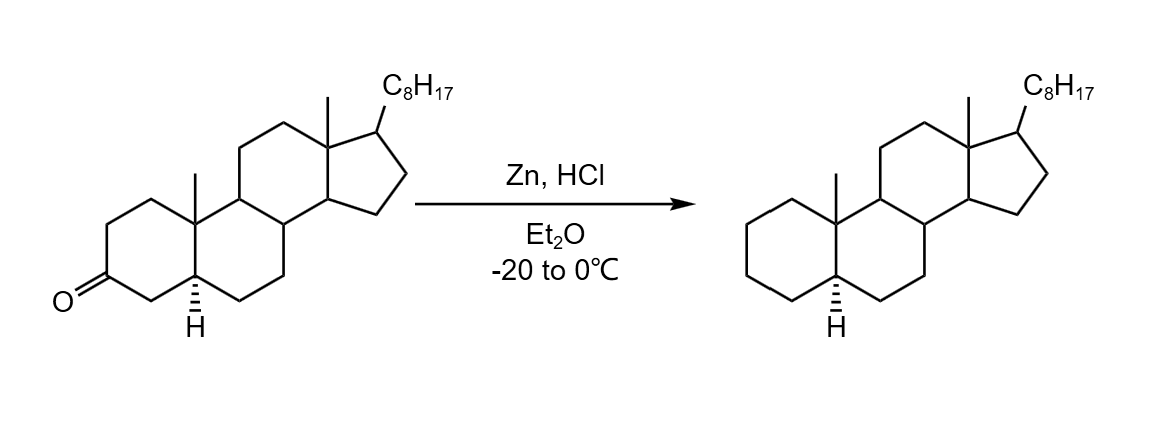
Scheme 4: Reducing cholestane-3-one to cholestane using Clemmensen reduction.

== Problems and alternative approaches ==
To perform the Clemmensen reduction, the substrate must be tolerant of the strongly acidic conditions of the reaction (37% HCl). Several alternatives are available. Wolff-Kishner reduction can reduce acid-sensitive substrates that are stable to strong bases. For substrates stable to hydrogenolysis in the presence of Raney nickel, a milder two-step Mozingo reduction method is available.

== See also ==
- Haworth phenanthrene synthesis
- Mozingo reduction
- Wolff-Kishner reduction
- Friedel-Crafts acylation
