= Erik Christian Clemmensen =

Danish-American chemist

Erik Christian Clemmensen (August 12, 1876 – May 21, 1941) was a Danish-American chemist. He is most commonly associated with the Clemmensen reduction, a method for converting a carbonyl group into a methylene group.

== Biography ==
Erik Christian Clemmensen was born on August 12, 1876, in Odense, Denmark.

He left school at the age of 15. He signed up to join an expedition on a warship, with the aim of becoming a naval officer, but illness prevented them from achieving this goal. Clemmensen studied at the Copenhagen Polytechnic Institute (now the Technical University of Denmark). He emigrated to the United States in 1900 and worked in the pharmaceutical industry. He joined the pharmaceutical company Parke, Davis & Co in Detroit, Michigan. For the invention of the Clemmensen reduction, he received his Ph.D. in 1913 from the University of Copenhagen.

In 1914, he co-founded the Commonwealth Chemical Corporation in Newark, New York, along with H.G. Chapman and Rhea Chittenden, where he developed methods for the manufacture of sodium benzoate, vanillin, and coumarin. After a fire in 1929, the company was acquired by Monsanto Chemical Company and moved to St. Louis, Missouri. While working for Monsanto, Clemmensen helped develop the synthesis of the artificial sweetener saccharin. In 1935, he returned to New York City and founded The Clemmensen Chemical Corp.

Clemmensen died on May 21, 1941, in Newark, New York.

== Legacy ==
He is best known for the reaction that he developed while at Parke, Davis & Co. This reaction involves the reduction of ketones using a zinc amalgam and HCl. It has been employed in the preparation of polycyclic aromatics and aromatics containing linear hydrocarbon side chains, the latter not being obtainable from a Friedel-Crafts alkylation.
