= Hydrogenation =

Chemical reaction between molecular hydrogen and another compound or element

Conditions
Catalyst	Ni, Pd, Pt

Catalysed hydrogenation
- Process type: Chemical
- Industrial sector(s): Food industry, petrochemical industry, pharmaceutical industry, agricultural industry
- Main technologies or sub-processes: Various transition metal catalysts, high-pressure technology
- Feedstock: Unsaturated substrates and hydrogen or hydrogen donors
- Product(s): Saturated hydrocarbons and derivatives
- Inventor: Paul Sabatier
- Year of invention: 1897

Steps in the hydrogenation of a C=C double bond at a catalyst surface, for example Ni or Pt : (1) The reactants are adsorbed on the catalyst surface and H_{2} dissociates. (2) An H atom bonds to one C atom. The other C atom is still attached to the surface. (3) A second C atom bonds to an H atom. The molecule leaves the surface.

Hydrogenation is a chemical reaction between molecular hydrogen (H_{2}) and another compound or element, usually in the presence of a catalyst such as nickel, palladium or platinum. The process is commonly employed to reduce or saturate organic compounds. Hydrogenation typically constitutes the addition of pairs of hydrogen atoms to a molecule, often an alkene. Catalysts are required for the reaction to be usable; non-catalytic hydrogenation takes place only at very high temperatures. Hydrogenation reduces double and triple bonds in hydrocarbons.

== Process ==
Hydrogenation has three components, the hydrogen source, the unsaturated substrate, and, generally, a catalyst. The conditions of the reaction - solvent (if any), temperatures, pressures - are determined by these same components. Some hydrogenations proceed at 1 atmosphere and at room temperature, while others proceed well at hundreds of degrees centigrade and hundreds of atmospheres pressure. Illustrative of a more demanding conditions is the hydrogenation of diethyl adipate, which is conducted at 2000-3000 psi H_{2} pressure and 255 °C. By contrast, hydrogenation of a terminal alkene using a homogeneous rhodium-based catalyst proceeds at 1 atm H_{2} and room temperature.

=== Hydrogen sources ===
As illustrated by the preceding examples, hydrogenation reactions generally employ gaseous, elemental dihydrogen (H_{2}), which is available commercially as pressurized cylinders. The hydrogenation process may require greater than one atmosphere of hydrogen. In some applications, a process termed transfer hydrogenation is used, wherein the hydrogen atoms added in the hydrogenation reaction are derived from compounds other than H_{2}, e.g., formic acid, isopropanol, and dihydroanthracene (substrates dehydrogenated to yield, respectively, carbon dioxide, acetone, and anthracene.

=== Substrates ===
Substrates for and products of hydrogenation
Substrate	Product	Comments	Heat of hydrogenation (kJ/mol)
R_{2}C=CR'_{2} (alkene)	R_{2}CHCHR'_{2} (alkane)	large application is production of margarine	−90 to −130
RC≡CR' (alkyne)	RCH_{2}CH_{2}R' (alkane)	semihydrogenation gives cis-RHC=CHR'	−300 (for full hydrogenation)
RCH=O (aldehyde)	RCH_{2}OH (primary alcohol)	often employs transfer hydrogenation	−60 to −65
R_{2}CO (ketone)	R_{2}CHOH (secondary alcohol)	often employs transfer hydrogenation	−60 to −65
RCO_{2}R' (ester)	RCH_{2}OH + R'OH (two alcohols)	often applies to production of fatty alcohols	−25 to −105
RCO_{2}H (carboxylic acid)	RCH_{2}OH (primary alcohol)	applicable to fatty alcohols	−25 to −75
RNO_{2} (nitro)	RNH_{2} (amine)	major application is aniline	−550

=== Catalysts ===
Catalysts are usually classified into two broad classes: homogeneous and heterogeneous. Heterogeneous catalysts are solids that are suspended in the same solvent with the substrate or are treated with gaseous substrate. Homogeneous catalysts are dissolved in solutions containing the unsaturated substrate. Heterogeneous catalysts are more widely used, in part because they are more readily separated from the product.

==== Heterogeneous catalysts ====
Heterogeneous catalysts vary widely in composition and are selected for the substrates. For the hydrogenation of alkenes and arenes, precious metals are often employed. A major exception being Raney nickel for hydrogenation of fats. For polar substrates like esters, copper catalysts are often favored.

Heterogeneous catalyst vary not only in the identity of the active metal(s) but also in the catalyst supports, the material upon which most heterogeneous catalysts are deposited. Supports allow the catalysts to have high surface areas, which is especially important for precious metals. Typical supports are activated carbon, alumina, calcium carbonate or barium sulfate. For example, platinum on carbon is produced by reduction of chloroplatinic acid in situ in carbon. Examples of these catalysts are 5% ruthenium on activated carbon, or 1% platinum on alumina. Base metal catalysts, such as Raney nickel, are typically much cheaper and do not need a support. In the laboratory, unsupported (massive) precious metal catalysts such as platinum black are still used, despite the cost.

==== Homogeneous catalysts ====
Some well known homogeneous catalysts are indicated below. These are coordination complexes that activate both the unsaturated substrate and the H_{2}. Most typically, these complexes contain platinum group metals, especially Rh and Ir.

Homogeneous hydrogenation catalysts and their precursors

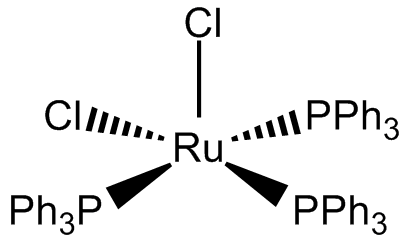
Dichlorotris(triphenylphosphine)ruthenium(II) is a precatalyst based on ruthenium.

Crabtree's catalyst is active for hydrogenation of sterically hindered alkenes

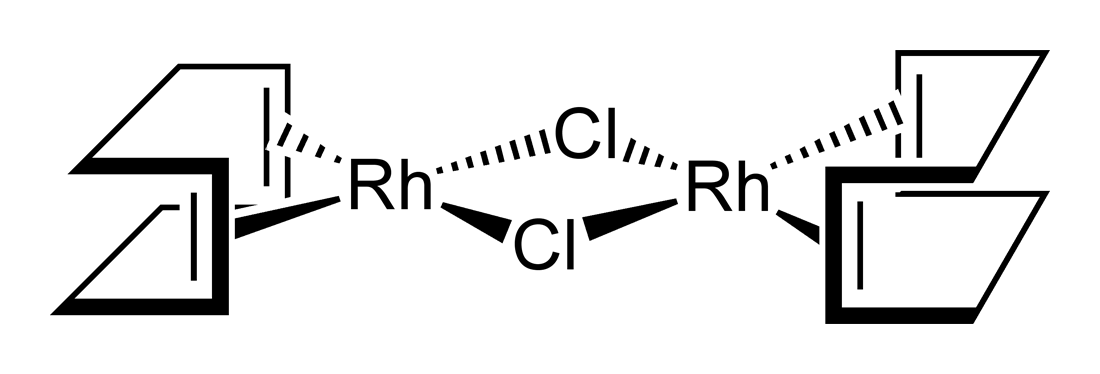
Cyclooctadiene rhodium chloride dimer, Rh_{2}Cl_{2}(cod)_{2} is a precursor to many homogeneous catalysts.

(S)-iPr-PHOX is a typical chelating phosphine ligand used in asymmetric hydrogenation.

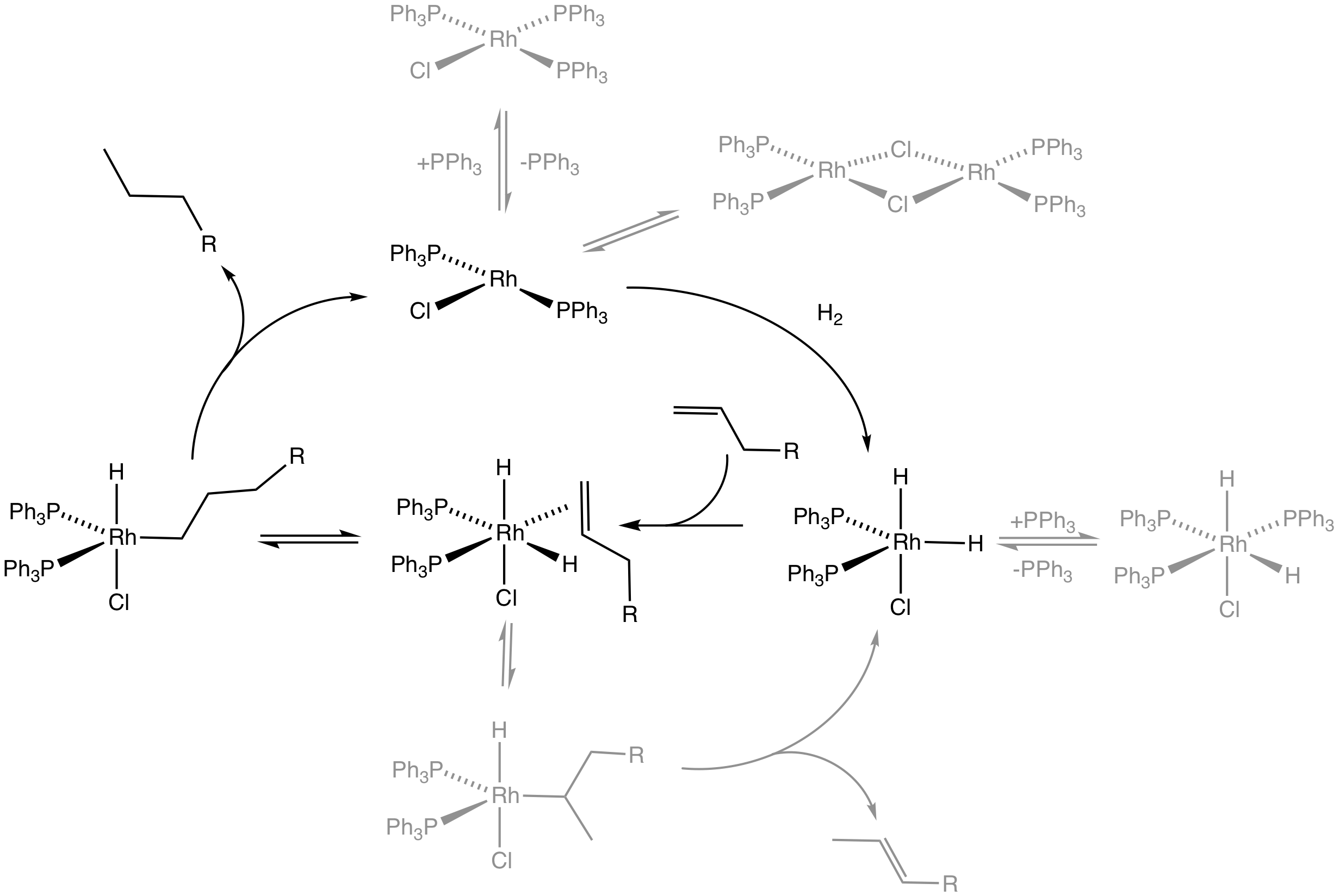
Mechanism for the hydrogenation of a terminal alkene using Wilkinson's catalyst.

Homogeneous catalysts are also used in asymmetric synthesis by the hydrogenation of prochiral substrates. An early demonstration of this approach was the Rh-catalyzed hydrogenation of enamides as precursors to the drug L-DOPA. To achieve asymmetric reduction, these catalyst are made chiral by use of chiral diphosphine ligands. Rhodium catalyzed hydrogenation has also been used in the herbicide production of S-metolachlor, which uses a Josiphos type ligand (called Xyliphos). In principle asymmetric hydrogenation can be catalyzed by chiral heterogeneous catalysts, but this approach remains more of a curiosity than a useful technology.

With rare exceptions, molecular hydrogen is unreactive toward organic compounds in the absence of metal catalysts. In a hydrogenation reaction involving a metal catalyst, unsaturated substrate is chemisorbed onto the catalyst, with most sites covered by the substrate. In heterogeneous catalysis, hydrogen forms surface hydrides (M-H) from which hydrogens can be transferred to the chemisorbed substrate. Platinum, palladium, rhodium, and ruthenium form highly active catalysts, which operate at lower temperatures and lower pressures of dihydrogen.

Non-precious metal catalysts, especially those based on nickel (such as Raney nickel and Urushibara nickel) have also been developed as economical alternatives, but they are often slower or require higher temperatures.

In hydrogenations, a trade-off can be the speed of the reaction vs. cost of the catalyst and apparatus required for use of high pressures. As in homogeneous catalysts, the activity is adjusted through changes in the environment around the metal, i.e. the coordination sphere. Different faces of a crystalline heterogeneous catalyst display distinct activities, for example. This can be modified by mixing metals or using different preparation techniques. Similarly, heterogeneous catalysts are affected by their supports.

In many cases, highly empirical modifications involve selective "poisons". Thus, a carefully chosen catalyst can be used to hydrogenate some functional groups without affecting others, such as the hydrogenation of alkenes without touching aromatic rings, or the selective hydrogenation of alkynes to alkenes using Lindlar's catalyst. For example, when the catalyst palladium is placed on barium sulfate and then treated with quinoline, the resulting catalyst reduces alkynes only as far as alkenes. The Lindlar catalyst has been applied to the conversion of phenylacetylene to styrene.

Illustrative hydrogenations

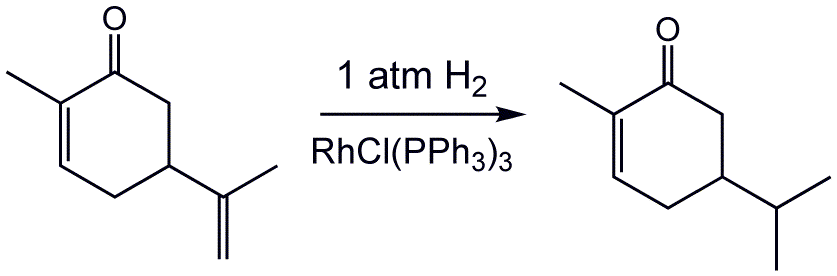
Selective hydrogenation of the less hindered alkene group in carvone using a homogeneous catalyst (Wilkinson's catalyst).

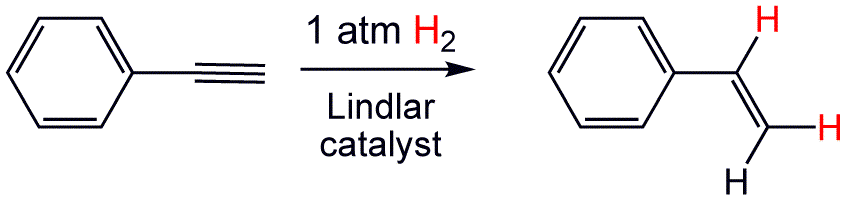
Partial hydrogenation of phenylacetylene using the Lindlar catalyst.

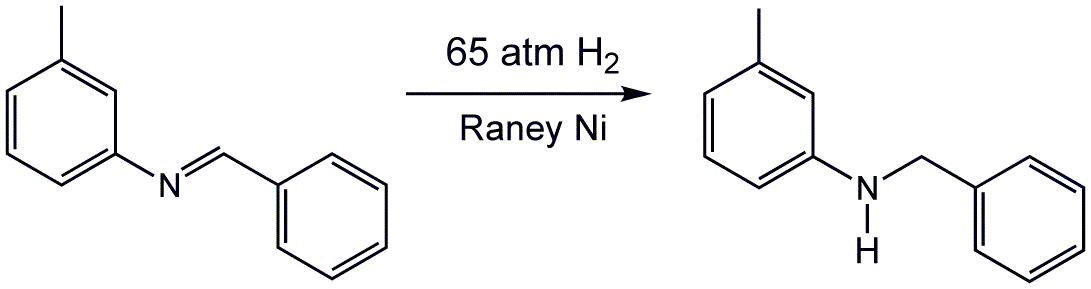
Hydrogenation of an imine using a Raney nickel catalyst, a popular heterogeneous catalyst.

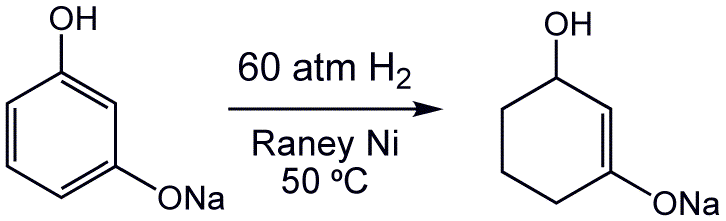
Partial hydrogenation of a resorcinol derivative using a Raney-Nickel catalyst.

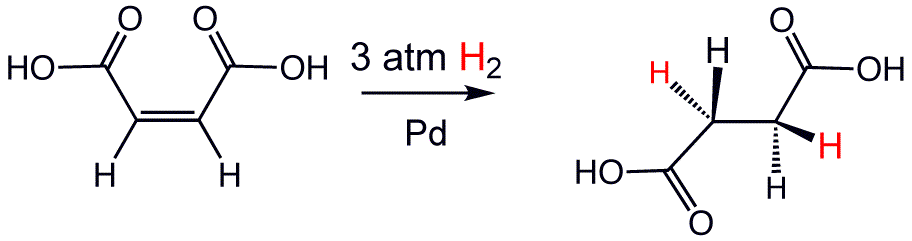
Hydrogenation of maleic acid to succinic acid.

== Thermodynamics ==
The addition of hydrogen to double or triple bonds in hydrocarbons is quite favorable thermodynamically. For example, the addition of hydrogen to ethylene has a Gibbs free energy change of −101 kJ⋅mol^{−1}, which is highly exergonic. In the hydrogenation of vegetable oils and fatty acids, for example, the heat released, about 25 kcal per mole (105 kJ/mol), is sufficient to raise the temperature of the oil by 1.6–1.7 °C (34.9–35.1 °F) per iodine number drop.

However, the reaction rate for most hydrogenation reactions is negligible in the absence of catalysts. The mechanism of metal-catalyzed hydrogenation of alkenes and alkynes has been extensively studied. First of all isotope labeling using deuterium confirms the regiochemistry of the addition:

RCH=CH_{2} + D_{2} → RCHDCH_{2}D

== Mechanism ==
The mechanism for the metal-catalyzed addition of H2 to alkenes and alkynes is similar for both heterogeneous and homogeneous catalysts. On solids, the mechanism is sometimes called the Horiuti-Polanyi mechanism:

1. Binding of the unsaturated substrate at the metal
2. Dissociation of H_{2} on the catalyst

the sequence of these steps is unclear or variable

1. Addition of one atom of hydrogen; this step is reversible
2. Addition of the second atom; effectively irreversible.

The mechanistic details are known in exquisite detail for homogeneous catalysis because the later can be interrogated spectroscopically. Some specific reactions are:

- binding of the hydrogen to give a dihydride complex via oxidative addition. Preceding the oxidative addition of H_{2} is the formation of a dihydrogen complex

L_{n}M + H_{2} → L_{n}M(H_{2})
L_{n}M(H_{2}) → L_{n}MH_{2}

- binding of alkene:

L_{n}MH_{2} + CH_{2}=CHR → L_{n}MH_{2}(CH_{2}=CHR)

The sequence of the preceding reactions is often reversed. The main point is the formation of an alkene-metal-dihydride

- transfer of one hydrogen atom from the metal to carbon (migratory insertion):

L_{n}MH_{2}(CH_{2}=CHR) → L_{n}M(H)(CH_{2}−CH_{2}R)

- transfer of the second hydrogen atom from the metal to the alkyl group with simultaneous dissociation of the alkane ("reductive elimination")

L_{n}M(H)(CH_{2}−CH_{2}R) → L_{n}M + CH_{3}−CH_{2}R

=== Selected mechanistic details ===
Many details are confirmed using D_{2} (deuterium) in place of H_{2}. Ordinarily the product contains a pair of adjacent deuterium atoms: RCH=CHR' + D_{2} → RCHD−CHDR'

An important characteristic of alkene and alkyne hydrogenations, both the homogeneously and heterogeneously-catalyzed versions, is that hydrogen addition occurs with "syn addition". Semihydrogenation of internal alkynes gives Z-alkenes.

H_{2} tends to add to the least hindered side.

Aromatic substrates are less reactive than typical alkenes. The first hydrogenation of an arene is slowest. The product of this step is a cyclohexadiene, which hydrogenate rapidly and are rarely detected. Similarly, the cyclohexene is ordinarily reduced to cyclohexane.

=== Side reactions ===
Alkene isomerization often accompanies hydrogenation. This side reaction proceeds by beta-hydride elimination of the alkyl intermediate:

L_{n}M(H)(CH_{2}−CH_{2}R) → L_{n}MH_{2}(CH_{2}=CHR)
L_{n}MH_{2}(CH_{2}=CHR) → L_{n}MH_{2} + CH_{2}=CHR

Often the released olefin is trans. Since trans olefins are less susceptible to hydrogenation than cis-olefins, they tend to accumulate. Similarly, under hydrogenation conditions, terminal alkenes convert to internal alkenes, which also resist hydrogenation for steric reasons. Such side reactions can be detected using deuterium labeling.

== Industrial applications ==
Catalytic hydrogenation has diverse industrial uses. Most frequently, industrial hydrogenation relies on heterogeneous catalysts.

=== Food industry ===
The food industry hydrogenates vegetable oils to convert them into solid or semi-solid fats that can be used in spreads, candies, baked goods, and other products like margarine. Vegetable oils are made from polyunsaturated fatty acids (having more than one carbon-carbon double bond). Hydrogenation eliminates some of these double bonds.

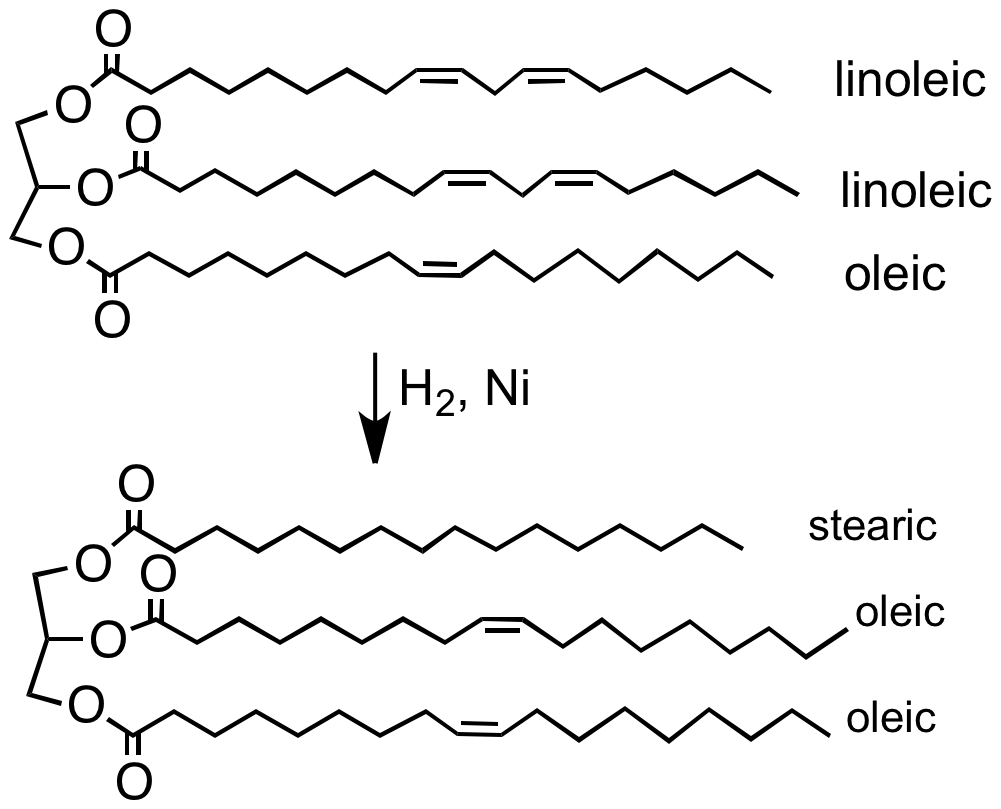
Partial hydrogenation of a typical plant oil to a typical component of margarine. Most of the C=C double bonds are removed in this process, which elevates the melting point of the product.

=== Petrochemical industry ===
In the petrochemical industry, hydrogenation of unsaturated substrates is subsidiary to other uses of hydrogen. More important are hydrocracking and hydrotreating. Hydrogenation is however used to convert alkenes and aromatics into saturated alkanes (paraffins) and cycloalkanes (naphthenes), which are less toxic and less reactive. Relevant to liquid fuels that are stored sometimes for long periods in air, saturated hydrocarbons exhibit superior storage properties. On the other hand, alkenes tend to form hydroperoxides, which can form gums that interfere with fuel handling equipment. For example, mineral turpentine is usually hydrogenated. Hydrocracking of heavy residues into diesel is another application. In isomerization and catalytic reforming processes, some hydrogen pressure is maintained to hydrogenolyze coke formed on the catalyst and prevent its accumulation.

=== Organic chemistry ===
Hydrogenation is widely used in organic chemistry as a means for converting unsaturated compounds into saturated derivatives. Substrates include not only alkenes and alkynes, with conversion to alkanes, and alkenes or alkanes, respectively but also ketones or aldehydes, and imines or nitriles, with conversion to alcohols and amines, respectively.

Thus, aldehydes and ketones are susceptible to hydrogenation to the corresponding alcohols. For example, xylitol, a sweet-tasting polyol, can be prepared by hydrogenation of the sugar xylose using a Raney nickel catalyst.

Primary amines can be synthesized by hydrogenation of nitriles. For example, isophorone diamine, a precursor to the polyurethane monomer isophorone diisocyanate, is produced from isophorone nitrile by a tandem reaction process involving both a nitrile hydrogenation.

== History ==
=== Heterogeneous catalytic hydrogenation ===
The earliest hydrogenation was that of the platinum-catalyzed addition of hydrogen to oxygen in the Döbereiner's lamp, a device commercialized as early as 1823. The French chemist Paul Sabatier is considered the father of the hydrogenation process now known as the Sabatier process. For this work, Sabatier shared the 1912 Nobel Prize in Chemistry. Wilhelm Normann was awarded a patent in Germany in 1902 and in Britain in 1903 for the hydrogenation of liquid oils, which was the beginning of what is now a worldwide industry.

In 1922, Voorhees and Adams described an apparatus for performing hydrogenation under pressures above one atmosphere. The Parr shaker, the first product to allow hydrogenation using elevated pressures and temperatures, was commercialized in 1926 based on Voorhees and Adams' research and remains in widespread use. In 1924 Murray Raney developed a finely powdered form of nickel, which is widely used to catalyze hydrogenation reactions such as conversion of nitriles to amines or the production of margarine.

=== Homogeneous catalytic hydrogenation ===
The 1960s witnessed the development of well defined homogeneous catalysts using transition metal complexes, e.g., Wilkinson's catalyst (RhCl(PPh_{3})_{3}). Soon thereafter cationic Rh and Ir were found to catalyze the hydrogenation of alkenes and carbonyls. In the 1970s, asymmetric hydrogenation was demonstrated in the synthesis of L-DOPA, and the 1990s saw the invention of Noyori asymmetric hydrogenation. The development of homogeneous hydrogenation was influenced by work started in the 1930s and 1940s on the oxo process and Ziegler–Natta polymerization.

== Specialized hydrogenation concepts ==
=== Transfer hydrogenation ===
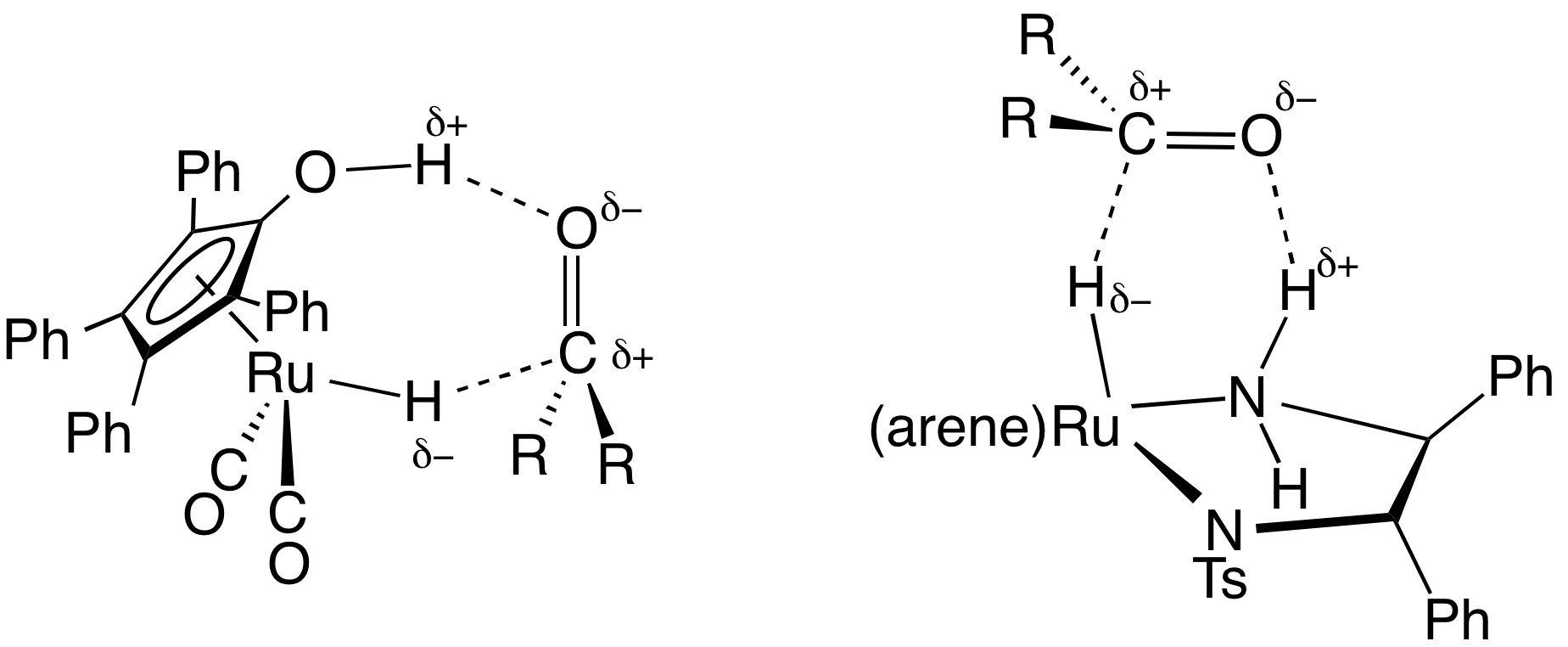
The transition state of two transfer-hydrogenation reactions from ruthenium-hydride complexes onto carbonyls

Transfer hydrogenation uses hydrogen-donor molecules other than molecular H_{2}. These "sacrificial" hydrogen donors, which can also serve as solvents for the reaction, include hydrazine, formic acid, and alcohols such as isopropanol.

Coal liquifaction can be achieved by heating coal under hydrogen pressure. The process is enhanced in the presence of organic hydrogen donors such as tetrahydronaphthalene. In other words this process, which is not very competitive commercially, is a form of transfer hydrogenation.

In organic synthesis, transfer hydrogenation is useful for the asymmetric hydrogenation of polar unsaturated substrates, such as ketones, aldehydes and imines, by employing chiral catalysts.

=== Electrolytic hydrogenation ===
Polar substrates such as nitriles can be hydrogenated electrochemically, using protic solvents and reducing equivalents as the source of hydrogen.

=== Metal-free hydrogenation ===
For most practical purposes, hydrogenation requires a metal catalyst. Hydrogenation can, however, proceed from some hydrogen donors without catalysts. Illustrative hydrogen donors include diimide and aluminium isopropoxide, the latter illustrated by the Meerwein–Ponndorf–Verley reduction. Some metal-free catalytic systems have been investigated. One such system for reduction of ketones consists of tert-butanol and potassium tert-butoxide and very high temperatures. The reaction depicted below describes the hydrogenation of benzophenone:

A chemical kinetics study found this reaction is first-order in all three reactants suggesting a cyclic 6-membered transition state. Another system for metal-free hydrogenation is based on the phosphine-borane, compound 1, which has been called a frustrated Lewis pair. It reversibly accepts dihydrogen at relatively low temperatures to form the phosphonium borate 2 which can reduce simple hindered imines.

== Equipment used for hydrogenation ==
Today's bench chemist has three main choices of hydrogenation equipment:

- Batch hydrogenation under atmospheric conditions
- Batch hydrogenation at elevated temperature and/or pressure
- Flow hydrogenation

=== Batch hydrogenation under atmospheric conditions ===
The original and still a commonly practised form of hydrogenation in teaching laboratories, this process is usually effected by adding solid catalyst to a round bottom flask of dissolved reactant which has been evacuated using nitrogen or argon gas and sealing the mixture with a penetrable rubber seal. Hydrogen gas is then supplied from a H_{2}-filled balloon. The resulting three phase mixture is agitated to promote mixing. Hydrogen uptake can be monitored, which can be useful for monitoring progress of a hydrogenation. This is achieved by either using a graduated tube containing a coloured liquid, usually aqueous copper sulfate or with gauges for each reaction vessel.

=== Batch hydrogenation at elevated temperature and/or pressure ===
Since many hydrogenation reactions such as hydrogenolysis of protecting groups and the reduction of aromatic systems proceed extremely sluggishly at atmospheric temperature and pressure, pressurised systems are popular. In these cases, catalyst is added to a solution of reactant under an inert atmosphere in a pressure vessel. Hydrogen is added directly from a cylinder or built in laboratory hydrogen source, and the pressurized slurry is mechanically rocked to provide agitation, or a spinning basket is used. Recent advances in electrolysis technology have led to the development of high pressure hydrogen generators, which generate hydrogen up to 1,400 psi (100 bar) from water. Heat may also be used, as the pressure compensates for the associated reduction in gas solubility.

=== Industrial reactors ===
Catalytic hydrogenation is done in a tubular plug-flow reactor packed with a supported catalyst. The pressures and temperatures are typically high, although this depends on the catalyst. Catalyst loading is typically much lower than in laboratory batch hydrogenation, and various promoters are added to the metal, or mixed metals are used, to improve activity, selectivity and catalyst stability. The use of nickel is common despite its low activity, due to its low cost compared to precious metals.

Gas liquid induction reactors (hydrogenator) are also used for carrying out catalytic hydrogenation.

== See also ==
- Carbon neutral fuel
- Dehydrogenation
- H-Bio
- Hydrodesulfurization, hydrotreater and oil desulfurization
- Hydrogenation of carbon–nitrogen double bonds
- Asymmetric hydrogenation
- Timeline of hydrogen technologies
- Transfer hydrogenation
