= Zinc amalgam =

Alloy of mercury and zinc

Zinc amalgam is a solution of zinc in mercury. In practice the term refers to particles of zinc with a surface coating of the amalgam. A gray solid, it is typically used for reduction. It is written as Zn(Hg) in reactions. It is usually prepared by treating an aqueous suspension of zinc with mercuric chloride. Some zinc chloride is produced in the process.

== Uses ==
- Used from ~1837 to reduce 'local action' which degraded operation of Voltaic piles. See History of the battery#Invention.
- To reduce ferric to ferrous ions in solution. See Jones reductor.
- To reduce ketones and aldehydes to alkanes via the Clemmensen reduction in acidic conditions.
