= Thioacetal =

Organosulfur compounds of the form –CH(O–)S– or –CH(S–)2

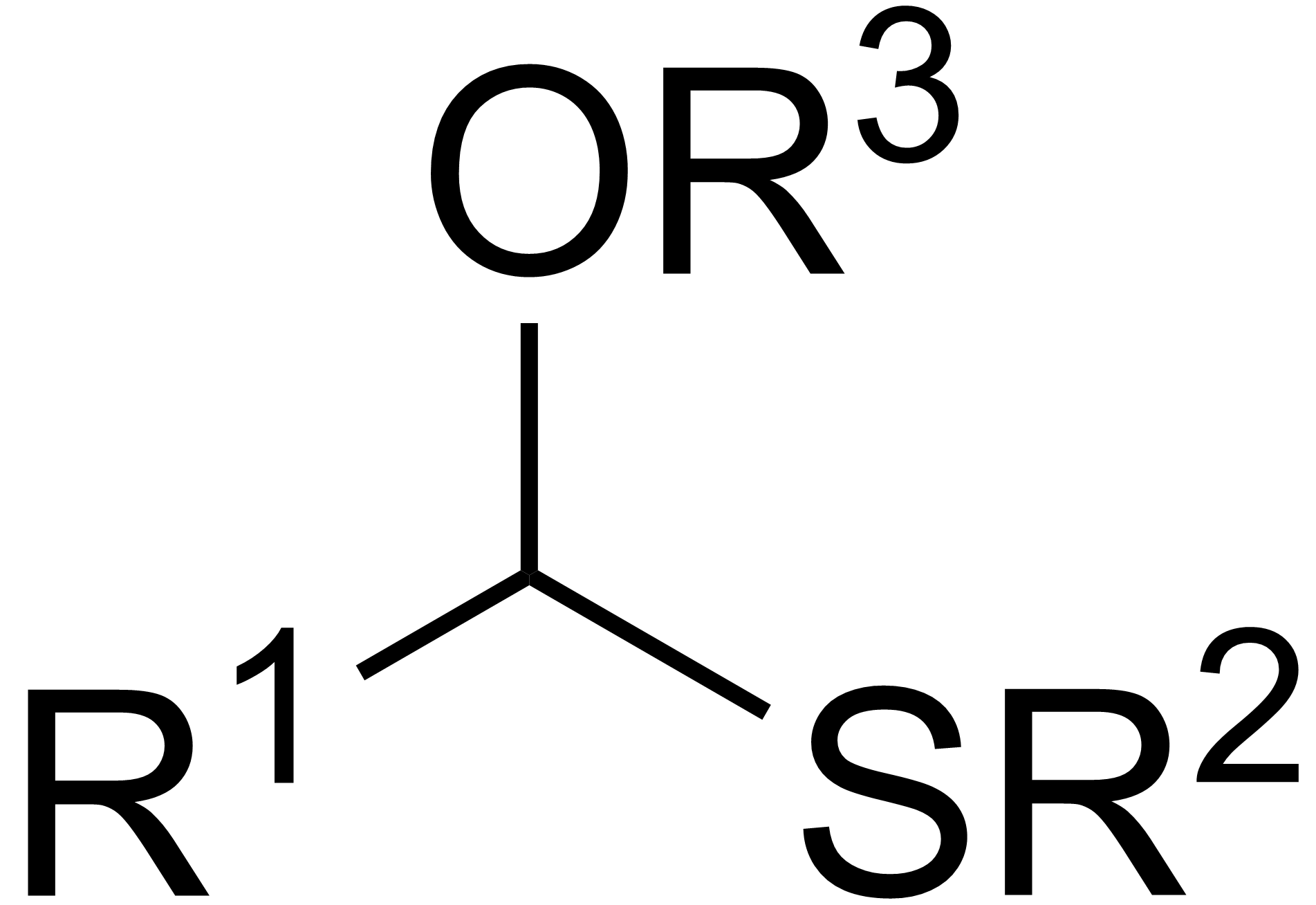
General structure of a monothioacetal

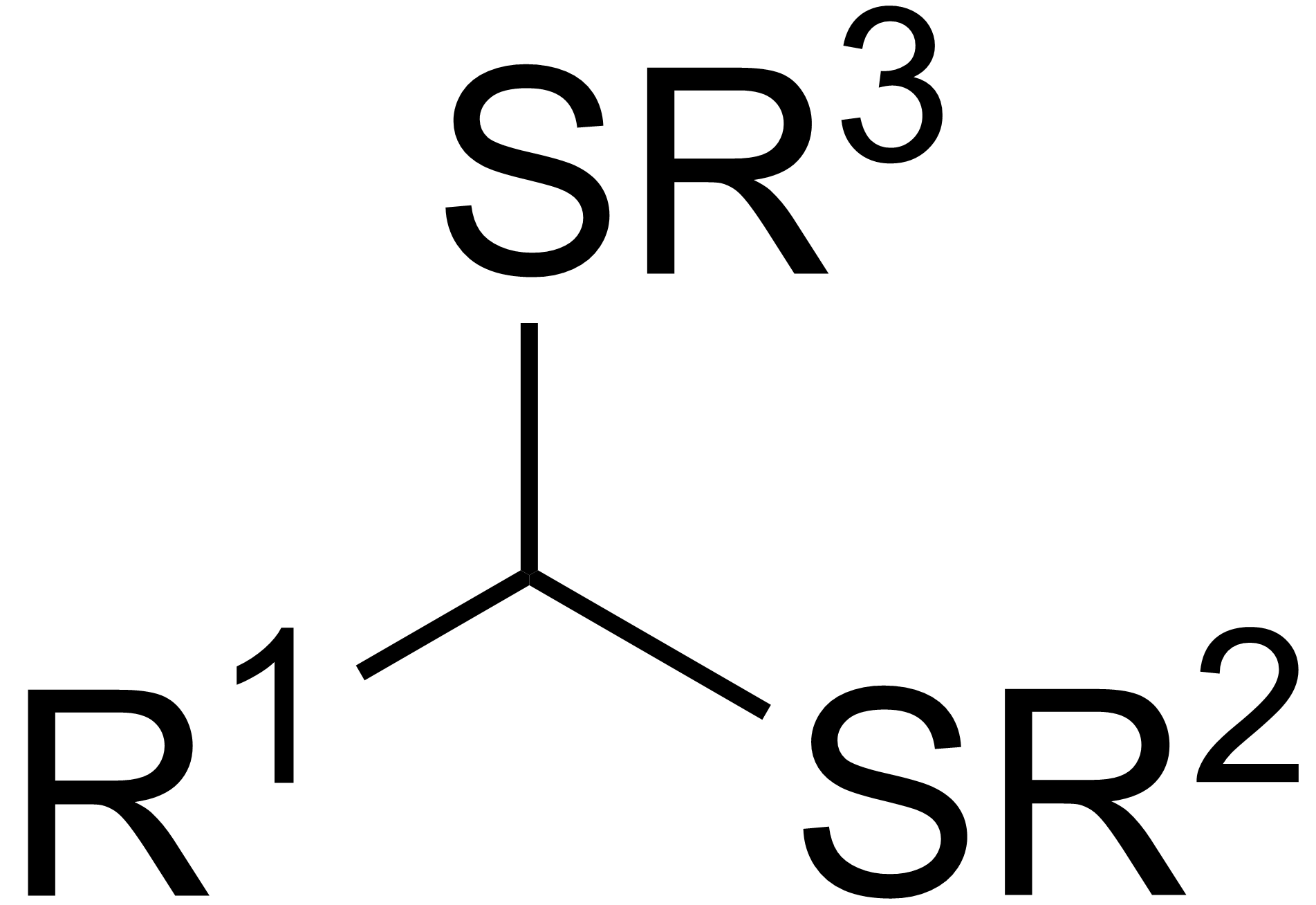
General structure of a dithioacetal

In organosulfur chemistry, thioacetals are the sulfur (thio-) analogues of acetals (R−CH(−OR)_{2}). There are two classes: the less-common monothioacetals, with the formula R−CH(−OR')−SR", and the dithioacetals, with the formula R−CH(−SR')_{2} (symmetric dithioacetals) or R−CH(−SR')−SR" (asymmetric dithioacetals).

The symmetric dithioacetals are relatively common. They are prepared by condensation of thiols (−SH) or dithiols (two −SH groups) with aldehydes (−CH=O). These reactions proceed via the intermediacy of hemithioacetals (R−CH(−OH)−SR'):

Thiol addition to give hemithioacetal:

RSH + R'CH(O) → R'CH(SR)OH

Thiol addition with loss of water to give dithioacetal:

RSH + R'CH(OH)SR → R'CH(SR)_{2} + H_{2}O

Such reactions typically employ either a Lewis acid or Brønsted acid as catalyst.

Dithioacetals generated from aldehydes and either 1,2-ethanedithiol or 1,3-propanedithiol are especially common among this class of molecules for use in organic synthesis.

The carbonyl carbon of an aldehyde is electrophilic and therefore susceptible to attack by nucleophiles, whereas the analogous central carbon of a dithioacetal is not electrophilic. As a result, dithioacetals can serve as protective groups for aldehydes.

Far from being unreactive, and in a reaction unlike that of aldehydes, that carbon can be deprotonated to render it nucleophilic:

R'CHS_{2}C_{2}H_{4} + R_{2}NLi → R'CLiS_{2}C_{2}H_{4} + R_{2}NH

The inversion of polarity between R'(H)C^{δ+}=O^{δ−} and R'CLi(SR)_{2} is referred to as umpolung. The reaction is commonly performed using the 1,3-dithiane. The lithiated intermediate can be used for various nucleophilic bond-forming reactions, and then the dithioketal hydrolyzed back to its carbonyl form. This overall process, the Corey–Seebach reaction, gives the synthetic equivalent of an acyl anion.

Selenenyl halides rearranges dithioacetals to dithioacyloins.

== See also ==
- Mozingo reduction
- Thioketal
