= Mozingo reduction =

Chemical reaction

Named after	Ralph Mozingo
Reaction type	Organic redox reaction

The Mozingo reduction, also known as Mozingo reaction or thioketal reduction, is a chemical reaction capable of fully reducing a ketone or aldehyde to the corresponding alkane via a dithioacetal. The reaction scheme is as follows:

The ketone or aldehyde is activated by conversion to cyclic dithioacetal by reaction with a dithiol (nucleophilic substitution) in presence of a H^{+} donating acid. The cyclic dithioacetal structure is then hydrogenolyzed using Raney nickel. Raney nickel is converted irreversibly to nickel sulfide. This method is milder than either the Clemmensen or Wolff-Kishner reductions, which employ strongly acidic or basic conditions, respectively, that might interfere with other functional groups.

== History ==
The reaction is named after Ralph Mozingo, who reported the cleavage of thioethers with Raney nickel in 1942. However the modern iteration of the reaction, involving the cyclic dithioacetal, was developed by Melville Wolfrom.
