= Functional group =

Group of atoms giving a molecule characteristic properties

Example functional groups of benzyl acetate: Ester group Acetyl group Benzyloxy group

In organic chemistry, a functional group is any substituent or moiety in a molecule that causes the molecule's characteristic chemical reactions. The same functional group will undergo the same or similar chemical reactions regardless of the rest of the molecule's composition. This enables systematic prediction of chemical reactions and behavior of chemical compounds and the design of chemical synthesis. The reactivity of a functional group can be modified by other functional groups nearby. Functional group interconversion can be used in retrosynthetic analysis to plan organic synthesis.

A functional group is a group of atoms in a molecule with distinctive chemical properties, regardless of the other atoms in the molecule. The atoms in a functional group are linked to each other and to the rest of the molecule by covalent bonds. For repeating units of polymers, functional groups attach to their nonpolar core of carbon atoms and thus add chemical character to carbon chains. Functional groups can also be charged, e.g. in carboxylate salts (−COO^{−}), which turns the molecule into a polyatomic ion or a complex ion. Functional groups binding to a central atom in a coordination complex are called ligands. Complexation and solvation are also caused by specific interactions of functional groups. In the common rule of thumb "like dissolves like", it is the shared or mutually well-interacting functional groups which give rise to solubility. For example, sugar dissolves in water because both share the hydroxyl functional group (−OH) and hydroxyls interact strongly with each other. Plus, when functional groups are more electronegative than atoms they attach to, the functional groups will become polar, and the otherwise nonpolar molecules containing these functional groups become polar and so become soluble in some aqueous environment.

Combining the names of functional groups with the names of the parent alkanes generates what is termed a systematic nomenclature for naming organic compounds. In traditional nomenclature, the first carbon atom after the carbon that attaches to the functional group is called the alpha carbon; the second, beta carbon, the third, gamma carbon, etc. If there is another functional group at a carbon, it may be named with the Greek letter, e.g., the gamma-amine in gamma-aminobutyric acid is on the third carbon of the carbon chain attached to the carboxylic acid group. IUPAC conventions call for numeric labeling of the position, e.g. 4-aminobutanoic acid. In traditional names various qualifiers are used to label isomers, for example, isopropanol (IUPAC name: propan-2-ol) is an isomer of n-propanol (propan-1-ol). The term moiety has some overlap with the term "functional group". However, a moiety is an entire "half" of a molecule, which can be not only a single functional group, but also a larger unit consisting of multiple functional groups. For example, an "aryl moiety" may be any group containing an aromatic ring, regardless of how many functional groups the said aryl has.

== Table of common functional groups ==
The following is a list of common functional groups. In the formulas, the symbols R and R' usually denote an attached hydrogen, or a hydrocarbon side chain of any length, but may sometimes refer to any group of atoms.

=== Hydrocarbons ===
Hydrocarbons are a class of molecule that is defined by functional groups called hydrocarbyls that contain only carbon and hydrogen, but vary in the number and order of double bonds. Each one differs in type (and scope) of reactivity.

Chemical class	Group	Formula	Structural Formula	Prefix	Suffix	Example
Alkane	Alkyl	R(CH_{2})_{n}H	Alkyl	alkyl-	-ane	Ethane
Alkene	Alkenyl	R_{2}C=CR_{2}	Alkene	alkenyl-	-ene	Ethylene (Ethene)
Alkyne	Alkynyl	RC≡CR′	$\ce{R-C#C-R'}$	alkynyl-	-yne	$\ce{H-C#C-H}$ Acetylene (Ethyne)
Benzene derivative	Phenyl	RC_{6}H_{5} RPh	Phenyl	phenyl-	‑benzene	Cumene (Isopropylbenzene)

There are also a large number of branched or ring alkanes that have specific names, e.g., tert-butyl, bornyl, cyclohexyl, etc. There are several functional groups that contain an alkene such as vinyl group, allyl group, or acrylic group. Hydrocarbons may form charged structures: positively charged carbocations or negative carbanions. Carbocations are often named -um. Examples are tropylium and triphenylmethyl cations and the cyclopentadienyl anion.

=== Groups containing halogens ===
Haloalkanes are a class of molecule that is defined by a carbon–halogen bond. This bond can be relatively weak (in the case of an iodoalkane) or quite stable (as in the case of a fluoroalkane). In general, with the exception of fluorinated compounds, haloalkanes readily undergo nucleophilic substitution reactions or elimination reactions. The substitution on the carbon, the acidity of an adjacent proton, the solvent conditions, etc. all can influence the outcome of the reactivity.

Chemical class	Group	Formula	Structural formula	Prefix	Suffix	Example
haloalkane	halo	RX	$\ce{R-X}$	halo-	alkyl halide	Chloroethane (Ethyl chloride)
fluoroalkane	fluoro	RF	$\ce{R-F}$	fluoro-	alkyl fluoride	Fluoromethane (Methyl fluoride)
chloroalkane	chloro	RCl	$\ce{R-Cl}$	chloro-	alkyl chloride	Chloromethane (Methyl chloride)
bromoalkane	bromo	RBr	$\ce{R-Br}$	bromo-	alkyl bromide	Bromomethane (Methyl bromide)
iodoalkane	iodo	RI	$\ce{R-I}$	iodo-	alkyl iodide	Iodomethane (Methyl iodide)

=== Groups containing oxygen ===
Compounds that contain C–O bonds each possess differing reactivity based upon the location and hybridization of the C–O bond, owing to the electron-withdrawing effect of sp²-hybridized oxygen (carbonyl groups) and the donating effects of sp³-hybridized oxygen (alcohol groups).

Chemical class	Group	Formula	Structural formula	Prefix	Suffix	Example
Alcohol	Hydroxy	ROH	Hydroxyl	hydroxy-	-ol	Methanol
Ketone	Ketone	RCOR′	Ketone	-oyl- (-COR′) or oxo- (=O)	-one	Butanone (Methyl ethyl ketone)
Aldehyde	Aldehyde	RCHO	Aldehyde	formyl- (-COH) or oxo- (=O)	-al	Acetaldehyde (Ethanal)
Acyl halide	Haloformyl	RCOX	Acyl halide	carbonofluoridoyl- carbonochloridoyl- carbonobromidoyl- carbonoiodidoyl-	-oyl halide	Acetyl chloride (Ethanoyl chloride)
Carbonate	Carbonate ester	ROCOOR′	Carbonate	(alkoxycarbonyl)oxy-	alkyl carbonate	Triphosgene (bis(trichloromethyl) carbonate)
Carboxylate	Carboxylate	RCOO^{−}	Carboxylate	carboxylato-	-oate	Sodium acetate (Sodium ethanoate)
Carboxylic acid	Carboxyl	RCOOH	Carboxylic acid	carboxy-	-oic acid	Acetic acid (Ethanoic acid)
Ester	Carboalkoxy	RCOOR′	Ester	alkanoyloxy- or alkoxycarbonyl	alkyl alkanoate	Ethyl butyrate (Ethyl butanoate)
Hydroperoxide	Hydroperoxy	ROOH	Hydroperoxy	hydroperoxy-	alkyl hydroperoxide	tert-Butyl hydroperoxide
Peroxide	Peroxy	ROOR′	Peroxy	peroxy-	alkyl peroxide	Di-tert-butyl peroxide
Ether	Ether	ROR′	Ether	alkoxy-	alkyl ether	Diethyl ether (Ethoxyethane)
Hemiacetal	Hemiacetal	R_{2}CH(OR_{1})(OH)	Hemiacetal	alkoxy -ol	-al alkyl hemiacetal	
Hemiketal	Hemiketal	RC(ORʺ)(OH)R′	Hemiketal	alkoxy -ol	-one alkyl hemiketal	
Acetal	Acetal	RCH(OR′)(OR″)	Acetal	dialkoxy-	-al dialkyl acetal	
Ketal (or Acetal)	Ketal (or Acetal)	RC(OR″)(OR‴)R′	Ketal	dialkoxy-	-one dialkyl ketal	
Orthoester	Orthoester	RC(OR′)(OR″)(OR‴)	Orthoester	trialkoxy-		
Heterocycle (if cyclic)	Methylenedioxy	(–OCH_{2}O–)		methylenedioxy-	-dioxole	1,2-Methylenedioxybenzene (1,3-Benzodioxole)
Orthocarbonate ester	Orthocarbonate ester	C(OR)(OR′)(OR″)(OR‴)	Orthocarbonate ester	tetralkoxy-	tetraalkyl orthocarbonate	Tetramethoxymethane
Organic acid anhydride	Carboxylic anhydride	R_{1}(CO)O(CO)R_{2}	Carboxylic anhydride		anhydride	Butyric anhydride

=== Groups containing nitrogen ===
Compounds that contain nitrogen in this category may contain C-O bonds, such as in the case of amides.

Chemical class	Group	Formula	Structural formula	Prefix	Suffix	Example
Amide	Carboxamide	RCONR'R"	Amide	carboxamido- or carbamoyl-	-amide	Acetamide (Ethanamide)
Amidine	Amidine	R_{4}C(NR_{1})(NR_{2}R_{3})		amidino-	-amidine	acetamidine (acetimidamide)
Guanidine	Guanidine	RNC(NR_{2})_{2}		Guanidin-	-Guanidine	Guanidinopropionic acid
Amines	Primary amine	RNH_{2}	Primary amine	amino-	-amine	Methylamine (Methanamine)
Amines	Secondary amine	R'R"NH	Secondary amine	amino-	-amine	Dimethylamine
Amines	Tertiary amine	R_{3}N	Tertiary amine	amino-	-amine	Trimethylamine
Amines	4° ammonium ion	R_{4}N^{+}	Quaternary ammonium cation	ammonio-	-ammonium	Choline
Amines	Hydrazone	R'R"CN_{2}H_{2}		hydrazino-	-hydrazine	Benzophenone hydrazone
Imine	Primary ketimine	RC(=NH)R'	Imine	imino-	-imine	
Imine	Secondary ketimine	RC(=NR")R'	Imine	imino-	-imine	
Imine	Primary aldimine	RC(=NH)H	Imine	imino-	-imine	Ethanimine
Imine	Secondary aldimine	RC(=NR')H	Imine	imino-	-imine	
Imide	Imide	(RCO)_{2}NR'	Imide	imido-	-imide	Succinimide (Pyrrolidine-2,5-dione)
Azide	Azide	RN_{3}	Organoazide	azido-	alkyl azide	Phenyl azide (Azidobenzene)
Azo compound	Azo (Diimide)	RN_{2}R'	Azo.pngl	azo-	-diazene	Methyl orange (p-dimethylamino-azobenzenesulfonic acid)
Cyanates	Cyanate	ROCN	Cyanate	cyanato-	alkyl cyanate	Methyl cyanate
Cyanates	Isocyanate	RNCO	Isocyanate	isocyanato-	alkyl isocyanate	Methyl isocyanate
Nitrate	Nitrate	RONO_{2}	Nitrate	nitrooxy-, nitroxy-	alkyl nitrate	Amyl nitrate (1-nitrooxypentane)
Nitrile	Nitrile	RCN	$\ce{R-\!#N}$	cyano-	alkanenitrile alkyl cyanide	Benzonitrile (Phenyl cyanide)
Nitrile	Isonitrile	RNC		isocyano-	alkaneisonitrile alkyl isocyanide	$\ce{H3C}{-}\overset{+}{\ce{N}}\ce{#C^-}$ Methyl isocyanide
Nitrite	Nitrosooxy	RONO	Nitrite	nitrosooxy-	alkyl nitrite	Isoamyl nitrite (3-methyl-1-nitrosooxybutane)
Nitro compound	Nitro	RNO_{2}	Nitro	nitro-		Nitromethane
Nitroso compound	Nitroso	RNO	Nitroso	nitroso- (Nitrosyl-)		Nitrosobenzene
Oxime	Oxime	RCH=NOH	Oxime		Oxime	Acetone oxime (2-Propanone oxime)
Pyridine derivative	Pyridyl	RC_{5}H_{4}N	4-pyridyl group 3-pyridyl group 2-pyridyl group	4-pyridyl (pyridin-4-yl) 3-pyridyl (pyridin-3-yl) 2-pyridyl (pyridin-2-yl)	-pyridine	Nicotine
Carbamate ester	Carbamate	RO(C=O)NR_{2}	Carbamate	(-carbamoyl)oxy-	-carbamate	Chlorpropham (Isopropyl (3-chlorophenyl)carbamate)

=== Groups containing sulfur ===
Compounds that contain sulfur exhibit unique chemistry due to sulfur's ability to form more bonds than oxygen, its lighter analogue on the periodic table. Substitutive nomenclature (marked as prefix in table) is preferred over functional class nomenclature (marked as suffix in table) for sulfides, disulfides, sulfoxides and sulfones.

Chemical class	Group	Formula	Structural formula	Prefix	Suffix	Example
Thiol	Sulfhydryl	RSH	Sulfhydryl	sulfanyl- (-SH)	-thiol	Ethanethiol
Sulfide (Thioether)	Sulfide	RSR'	Sulfide group	substituent sulfanyl- (-SR')	di(substituent) sulfide	(Methylsulfanyl)methane (prefix) or Dimethyl sulfide (suffix)
Disulfide	Disulfide	RSSR'	Disulfide	substituent disulfanyl- (-SSR')	di(substituent) disulfide	(Methyldisulfanyl)methane (prefix) or Dimethyl disulfide (suffix)
Sulfoxide	Sulfinyl	RSOR'	Sulfinyl group	-sulfinyl- (-SOR')	di(substituent) sulfoxide	(Methanesulfinyl)methane (prefix) or Dimethyl sulfoxide (suffix)
Sulfone	Sulfonyl	RSO_{2}R'	Sulfonyl group	-sulfonyl- (-SO_{2}R')	di(substituent) sulfone	(Methanesulfonyl)methane (prefix) or Dimethyl sulfone (suffix)
Sulfinic acid	Sulfino	RSO_{2}H		sulfino- (-SO_{2}H)	-sulfinic acid	2-Aminoethanesulfinic acid
Sulfonic acid	Sulfo	RSO_{3}H	Sulfonyl group	sulfo- (-SO_{3}H)	-sulfonic acid	Benzenesulfonic acid
Sulfonate ester	Sulfo	RSO_{3}R'	Sulfonic ester	(-sulfonyl)oxy- or alkoxysulfonyl-	R' R-sulfonate	Methyl trifluoromethanesulfonate or Methoxysulfonyl trifluoromethane (prefix)
Thiocyanate	Thiocyanate	RSCN	Thiocyanate	thiocyanato- (-SCN)	substituent thiocyanate	Phenyl thiocyanate
Thiocyanate	Isothiocyanate	RNCS	Isothiocyanate	isothiocyanato- (-NCS)	substituent isothiocyanate	Allyl isothiocyanate
Thioketone	Carbonothioyl	RCSR'	Thione	-thioyl- (-CSR') or sulfanylidene- (=S)	-thione	Diphenylmethanethione (Thiobenzophenone)
Thial	Carbonothioyl	RCSH	Thial	methanethioyl- (-CSH) or sulfanylidene- (=S)	-thial	Thioformaldehyde (methanethial)
Thiocarboxylic acid	Carbothioic S-acid	RC=OSH	Thioic S-acid	mercaptocarbonyl-	-thioic S-acid	Thiobenzoic acid (benzothioic S-acid)
Thiocarboxylic acid	Carbothioic O-acid	RC=SOH	Thioic O-acid	hydroxy(thiocarbonyl)-	-thioic O-acid	
Thioester	Thiolester	RC=OSR'	Thiolester		S-alkyl-alkane-thioate	S-Methyl thioacrylate (S-Methyl prop-2-enethioate)
Thioester	Thionoester	RC=SOR'	Thionoester		O-alkyl-alkane-thioate	
Dithiocarboxylic acid	Carbodithioic acid	RCS_{2}H	Dithiocarboxylic acid	dithiocarboxy-	-dithioic acid	Dithiobenzoic acid (Benzenecarbodithioic acid)
Dithiocarboxylic acid ester	Carbodithio	RC=SSR'	Dithioate		-dithioate	

=== Groups containing phosphorus ===
Compounds that contain phosphorus exhibit unique chemistry due to the ability of phosphorus to form more bonds than nitrogen, its lighter analogue on the periodic table.

Chemical class	Group	Formula	Structural formula	Prefix	Suffix	Example
Phosphine (Phosphane)	Phosphino	R_{3}P	A tertiary phosphine	phosphanyl-	-phosphane	Methylpropylphosphane
Phosphonic acid	Phosphono	$\ce{RP(=O)(OH)2}$	Phosphono group	phosphono-	substituent phosphonic acid	Benzylphosphonic acid
Phosphate	Phosphate	$\ce{ROP(=O)(OH)2}$	Phosphate group	phosphonooxy- or O-phosphono- (phospho-)	substituent phosphate	Glyceraldehyde 3-phosphate (suffix)
Phosphate	Phosphate	$\ce{ROP(=O)(OH)2}$	Phosphate group	phosphonooxy- or O-phosphono- (phospho-)	substituent phosphate	O-Phosphonocholine (prefix) (Phosphocholine)
Phosphodiester	Phosphate	HOPO(OR)_{2}	Phosphodiester	[(alkoxy)hydroxyphosphoryl]oxy- or O-[(alkoxy)hydroxyphosphoryl]-	di(substituent) hydrogen phosphate or phosphoric acid di(substituent) ester	DNA
Phosphodiester	Phosphate	HOPO(OR)_{2}	Phosphodiester	[(alkoxy)hydroxyphosphoryl]oxy- or O-[(alkoxy)hydroxyphosphoryl]-	di(substituent) hydrogen phosphate or phosphoric acid di(substituent) ester	O‑[(2‑Guanidinoethoxy)hydroxyphosphoryl]‑l‑serine (prefix) (Lombricine)

=== Groups containing boron ===
Compounds containing boron exhibit unique chemistry due to their having partially filled octets and therefore acting as Lewis acids.

Chemical class	Group	Formula	Structural formula	Prefix	Suffix	Example
Boronic acid	Borono	RB(OH)_{2}		Borono-	substituent boronic acid	Phenylboronic acid
Boronic ester	Boronate	RB(OR)_{2}		O-[bis(alkoxy)alkylboronyl]-	substituent boronic acid di(substituent) ester	
Borinic acid	Borino	R_{2}BOH		Hydroxyborino-	di(substituent) borinic acid	
Borinic ester	Borinate	R_{2}BOR		O-[alkoxydialkylboronyl]-	di(substituent) borinic acid substituent ester	Diphenylborinic acid 2-aminoethyl ester (2-Aminoethoxydiphenyl borate)

=== Groups containing metals ===
Chemical class	Structural formula	Prefix	Suffix	Example
Alkyllithium	RLi	(tri/di)alkyl-	-lithium	methyllithium
Alkylmagnesium halide	RMgX (X=Cl, Br, I)^{[note 1]}	(tri/di)alkyl-	-magnesium halide	methylmagnesium chloride
Alkylaluminium	Al_{2}R_{6}	(tri/di)alkyl-	-aluminium	trimethylaluminium
Silyl ether	R_{3}SiOR	(tri/di)alkyl-	-silyl ether	trimethylsilyl triflate

^{note 1} Fluorine is too electronegative to be bonded to magnesium; it becomes an ionic salt instead.

=== Names of radicals or moieties ===
These names are used to refer to the moieties themselves or to radical species, and also to form the names of halides and substituents in larger molecules.

When the parent hydrocarbon is unsaturated, the suffix ("-yl", "-ylidene", or "-ylidyne") replaces "-ane" (e.g. "ethane" becomes "ethyl"); otherwise, the suffix replaces only the final "-e" (e.g. "ethyne" becomes "ethynyl").

When used to refer to moieties, multiple single bonds differ from a single multiple bond. For example, a methylene bridge (methanediyl) has two single bonds, whereas a methylidene group (methylidene) has one double bond. Suffixes can be combined, as in methylidyne (triple bond) vs. methylylidene (single bond and double bond) vs. methanetriyl (three double bonds).

There are some retained names, such as methylene for methanediyl, 1,x-phenylene for phenyl-1,x-diyl (where x is 2, 3, or 4), carbyne for methylidyne, and trityl for triphenylmethyl.

Chemical class	Group	Formula	Structural formula	Prefix	Suffix	Example
Single bond		R•		Ylo-	-yl	Methyl group Methyl radical
Double bond		R:		?	-ylidene	Methylidene
Triple bond		R⫶		?	-ylidyne	Methylidyne
Carboxylic acyl radical	Acyl	R−C(=O)•		?	-oyl	Acetyl

== See also ==
- Category:Functional groups
- Group contribution method
