= C4H8OS =

The molecular formula C_{4}H_{8}OS (molar mass: 104.17 g/mol, exact mass: 104.0296 u) may refer to:

- O-Ethyl thioacetate
- S-Ethyl thioacetate
- 1,4-Oxathiane
- Methional
