= Thioacyl chloride =

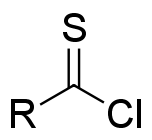
General structure of the thioacyl chloride functional group

In organic chemistry, a thioacyl chloride is an organic compound containing the functional group −C(=S)Cl. Their formula is usually written R−C(S)Cl, where R is a side chain. Thioacyl chlorides are analogous to acyl chlorides, but much rarer and less robust. Indeed, one of the simplest, thioacetyl chloride (c.f. acetyl chloride), remained unknown as of 1972.

Most thioacyl halides are "highly coloured, labile oils with pronounced pungent odours". Simple alkyl derivatives are volatile.

The best studied thioacyl chloride is thiobenzoyl chloride, a purple oil first prepared by chlorination of dithiobenzoic acid with a combination of chlorine and thionyl chloride. A more modern preparation employs phosgene as the chlorinating agent, by-producing carbonyl sulfide:

PhCS_{2}H + COCl_{2} → PhC(S)Cl + HCl + COS

One example of a thioacyl chloride has been crystallized.

In general, thioacyl chlorides are produced from passing halocarbons through phosphorus pentasulfide or boiling sulfur. Such is the case for the simplest thioacyl chloride, thiophosgene. Thiocarbamyl and -carbonyl chlorides are prepared from the corresponding amines and alcohols by careful thiophosgenation.

== Reactions ==
Thioacyl chlorides are electrophilic at the carbon atom. Amines, alcohols, and thiols displace the chloride to form (respectively) thioamides, thionoesters, and dithioesters. Friedel-Crafts reaction thioacylate arenes.

Cyanide reacts with thioacyl chlorides to form thioacyl cyanides. These thioacyl cyanides are known to dimerize to dicyanoalkenes, eliminating sulfur. Likewise thioacyl azide cyclizes to a thiatriazole, and diazo compounds and tetrazoles react to thiadiazoles.

Like other unstabilized thiocarbonyls, thioacyl chlorides undergo a variety of dimerization and cycloaddition reactions. "Simple thiocarbonyl halides all show a tendency to dimerize to some degree, especially fluorothioacyl fluorides," the only exception being trifluorothioacetyl fluoride. Carbenes attack the double bond to form episulfides, and the double-bond in general is an extremely active dienophile.

== Safety ==
Thioacyl chlorides are toxic.
