= Thiocarbonyldiimidazole =

Names
- Preferred IUPAC name Di(1H-imidazol-1-yl)methanethione
- Other names TCDI

Identifiers
CAS Number	6160-65-2
3D model (JSmol)	Interactive image
ChemSpider	72506
ECHA InfoCard	100.025.622
EC Number	228-183-4
PubChem CID	80264
UNII	H8A75XB5AY
CompTox Dashboard (EPA)	DTXSID70210614
- InChI: InChI=1S/C7H6N4S/c12-7(10-3-1-8-5-10)11-4-2-9-6-11/h1-6H Key: RAFNCPHFRHZCPS-UHFFFAOYSA-N
- SMILES: C1=CN(C=N1)C(=S)N2C=CN=C2

Properties
Chemical formula	C_{7}H_{6}N_{4}S
Molar mass	178.21 g·mol^{−1}
Melting point	101 to 103 °C (214 to 217 °F; 374 to 376 K)
- Except where otherwise noted, data are given for materials in their standard state (at 25 °C [77 °F], 100 kPa). Infobox references

1,1'-Thiocarbonyldiimidazole (TCDI) is a thiourea containing two imidazole rings. It is the sulfur analog of the peptide coupling reagent carbonyldiimidazole (CDI).

== Synthesis ==
TCDI is commercially available but can also be prepared via the reaction of thiophosgene with two equivalents of imidazole.

== Reactions ==
The imidazole groups on TCDI can be easily displaced, allowing it to act as a safer alternative to thiophosgene. This behaviour has been used in the Corey–Winter olefin synthesis. It may also replace thioacyl chlorides (RC(S)Cl) in the Barton–McCombie deoxygenation. Other uses include the synthesis of thioamides and thiocarbamates. Like the analogous CDI, it may be used for peptide coupling.
