= Thiocarboxylic acid =

Organic compounds with the tautomeric structures RC(S)OH or RC(O)SH

Thione form (carbothioic O-acid)

Thiol form (carbothioic S-acid)

In organic chemistry, thiocarboxylic acids or carbothioic acids are organosulfur compounds related to carboxylic acids by replacement of one of the oxygen atoms with a sulfur atom. Two tautomers are possible: a thione form (RC(S)OH) and a thiol form (RC(O)SH). These are sometimes also referred to as "carbothioic O-acid" and "carbothioic S-acid" respectively. Of these the thiol form is most common (e.g. thioacetic acid).

Thiocarboxylic acids are rare in nature, however the biosynthetic components for producing them appear widespread in bacteria. Examples include pyridine-2,6-dicarbothioic acid, and thioquinolobactin.

== Synthesis ==
Thiocarboxylic acids are typically prepared by salt metathesis from the acid chloride, as in the following conversion of benzoyl chloride to thiobenzoic acid using potassium hydrosulfide according to the following idealized equation:

C_{6}H_{5}C(O)Cl + KSH → C_{6}H_{5}C(O)SH + KCl

Covalent sulfides, such as P_{2}S_{5}, generally give poor yields unless catalyzed with triphenylstibine oxide.

2,6-Pyridinedicarbothioic acid is synthesized by treating the diacid dichloride with a solution of H_{2}S in pyridine:

NC_{5}H_{3}(COCl)_{2} + 2 H_{2}S + 2 C_{5}H_{5}N → [C_{5}H_{5}NH^{+}][HNC_{5}H_{3}(COS)^{−}_{2}] + [C_{5}H_{5}NH]Cl

This reaction produces the orange pyridinium salt of pyridinium-2,6-dicarbothioate. Treatment of this salt with sulfuric acid gives colorless the bis(thiocarboxylic acid), which can then be extracted with dichloromethane.

== Reactions ==
At neutral pH, thiocarboxylic acids are fully ionized. Thiocarboxylic acids are about 100 times more acidic than the analogous carboxylic acids. Thiobenzoic acid has a pK_{a} of 2.48 compared with 4.20 for benzoic acid, and thioacetic acid has a pK_{a} near 3.4 compared with 4.72 for acetic acid. Alkylation of the corresponding thioate ion gives a thioester.

Thiolates are highly nucleophilic, attacking electron-poor olefins.

The conjugate base of thioacetic acid, thioacetate, installs thiol groups in two steps from alkyl halides. First, the halide is displaced to give a thioester intermediate; then the product hydrolyzed:

R−X + CH_{3}COS^{−} → R−SC(O)CH_{3} + X^{−}
R−SC(O)CH_{3} + H_{2}O → R−SH + CH_{3}CO_{2}H

The latter reaction is quite general, as thioic acids are comparably susceptible to nucleophilic substitution as acyl halides.

Thioic acids are scarcely electrophilic, but, similar to thiols, radicalize to an electrophilic RC(=O)S^{•}. Thiocarboxylic acids add to electron-rich olefins in a free-radical substitution.

Thiocarboxylic acids react with various nitrogen functional groups, such as organic azide, nitro, and isocyanate compounds, to give amides under mild conditions. This method avoids needing the amine to initiate an amide-forming acyl substitution but does requires synthesis and handling of the unstable thiocarboxylic acid. Unlike the Schmidt reaction or other nucleophilic-attack pathways, reaction with an aryl or alkyl azide begins with a [3+2] cycloaddition. The resulting heterocycle expels N_{2} and the sulfur atom to give the monosubstituted amide.

Halogens or their equivalents (e.g. sulfuryl chloride) oxidize thiocarboxylic acids to acylsulfenyl halides. The latter are unstable, and decay over the course of several hours to the free halogen and the diacyl disulfide.

== See also ==
- Dithiocarboxylic acid
- Thiocarbamate
- Thiocarbonate
- Thiocarbonic acid
- Thioformic acid, the simplest thiocarboxylic acid
