= Dodecanoyl-(acyl-carrier-protein) hydrolase =

dodecanoyl-[acyl-carrier-protein] hydrolase

Identifiers
- EC no.: 3.1.2.21
- CAS no.: 137903-37-8

Databases
- IntEnz: IntEnz view
- BRENDA: BRENDA entry
- ExPASy: NiceZyme view
- KEGG: KEGG entry
- MetaCyc: metabolic pathway
- PRIAM: profile
- PDB structures: RCSB PDB PDBe PDBsum
- Gene Ontology: AmiGO / QuickGO
Search
- PMC: articles
- PubMed: articles
- NCBI: proteins

The enzyme dodecanoyl-[acyl-carrier-protein] hydrolase (EC 3.1.2.21) catalyzes the reaction

a dodecanoyl-[acyl-carrier-protein] + H_{2}O $\rightleftharpoons$ an [acyl-carrier-protein] + dodecanoate

This enzyme belongs to the family of hydrolases, specifically those acting on thioester bonds. The systematic name is dodecanoyl-[acyl-carrier-protein] hydrolase. Other names in common use include lauryl-acyl-carrier-protein hydrolase, dodecanoyl-acyl-carrier-protein hydrolase, dodecyl-acyl-carrier protein hydrolase, and dodecanoyl-[acyl-carrier protein] hydrolase.
