= Thiobenzoic acid =

Names
- Preferred IUPAC name Benzenecarbothioic S-acid
- Other names: Benzoyl thiol; Monothiobenzoic acid

Identifiers
CAS Number	98-91-9
3D model (JSmol)	Interactive image
ChemSpider	7136
ECHA InfoCard	100.002.466
EC Number	202-712-9202-712-9
Gmelin Reference	1071790
PubChem CID	7414
RTECS number	DH6839000
UNII	GBG5RLO56N
CompTox Dashboard (EPA)	DTXSID3059181
- InChI: InChI=1S/C7H6OS/c8-7(9)6-4-2-1-3-5-6/h1-5H,(H,8,9)
- SMILES: C1=CC=C(C=C1)C(=O)S

Properties
Chemical formula	C_{7}H_{6}OS
Molar mass	138.18 g·mol^{−1}
Appearance	yellow liquid
Density	1.1775 g/cm3
Melting point	24 °C (75 °F; 297 K)
Boiling point	222 °C (432 °F; 495 K)
Solubility in water	soluble
Vapor pressure	0.1
Acidity (pK_{a})	2.48
- Except where otherwise noted, data are given for materials in their standard state (at 25 °C [77 °F], 100 kPa). Infobox references

Thiobenzoic acid is an organosulfur compound with molecular formula C_{6}H_{5}COSH. It is the parent of aryl thiocarboxylic acids. It is a pale yellow liquid that freezes just below room temperature. The structure of thiobenzoic acid has not been examined by X-ray crystallography but the 4-methyl derivative has been reported. The CC(O)SH group is planar with syn geometry. The C=O and C-S lengths are respectively 120 and 177 pm.

== Synthesis and reactions ==
Thiobenzoic acid is prepared by treatment of benzoyl chloride with potassium hydrosulfide:

C_{6}H_{5}C(O)Cl + KSH → C_{6}H_{5}C(O)SH + KCl

With a pK_{a} near 2.5, this acid is almost 100x more acidic than benzoic acid. The conjugate base is thiobenzoate, C_{6}H_{5}COS^{−}.

Oxidation of thiobenzoic acid gives the disulfide (C_{6}H_{5}C(O)S)_{2}.

== See also ==
- Dithiobenzoic acid
