= ADP-dependent medium-chain-acyl-CoA hydrolase =

Identifiers
- EC no.: 3.1.2.19
- CAS no.: 63363-75-7

Databases
- IntEnz: IntEnz view
- BRENDA: BRENDA entry
- ExPASy: NiceZyme view
- KEGG: KEGG entry
- MetaCyc: metabolic pathway
- PRIAM: profile
- PDB structures: RCSB PDB PDBe PDBsum
- Gene Ontology: AmiGO / QuickGO
Search
- PMC: articles
- PubMed: articles
- NCBI: proteins

The enzyme ADP-dependent medium-chain-acyl-CoA hydrolase (EC 3.1.2.19) catalyzes the reaction

acyl-CoA + H_{2}O $\rightleftharpoons$ CoA + a carboxylate

This enzyme belongs to the family of hydrolases, specifically those acting on thioester bonds. The systematic name is ADP-dependent-medium-chain-acyl-CoA hydrolase. Other names in common use include medium-chain acyl coenzyme A hydrolase, medium-chain acyl-CoA hydrolase, medium-chain acyl-thioester hydrolase, medium-chain hydrolase, and myristoyl-CoA thioesterase. It employs one cofactor, ADP. At least one compound, NADH is known to inhibit this enzyme.
