= Citrate lyase deacetylase =

Enzyme

[citrate-(pro-3S)-lyase] thiolesterase

Identifiers
- EC no.: 3.1.2.16
- CAS no.: 58319-93-0

Databases
- IntEnz: IntEnz view
- BRENDA: BRENDA entry
- ExPASy: NiceZyme view
- KEGG: KEGG entry
- MetaCyc: metabolic pathway
- PRIAM: profile
- PDB structures: RCSB PDB PDBe PDBsum
- Gene Ontology: AmiGO / QuickGO
Search
- PMC: articles
- PubMed: articles
- NCBI: proteins

The enzyme citrate lyase deacetylase (EC 3.1.2.16) catalyzes the reaction

acetyl-[citrate (pro-3S)-lyase] + H_{2}O = holo-[citrate (pro-3S)-lyase] + acetate

This enzyme belongs to the family of hydrolases, specifically those acting on thioester bonds. The systematic name is acetyl-[citrate-(pro-3S)-lyase] hydrolase. This enzyme is also called [citrate-(pro-3S)-lyase] thiolesterase.
