= Hydrogen-sulfide S-acetyltransferase =

hydrogen-sulfide S-acetyltransferase

Identifiers
- EC no.: 2.3.1.10
- CAS no.: 9029-92-9

Databases
- IntEnz: IntEnz view
- BRENDA: BRENDA entry
- ExPASy: NiceZyme view
- KEGG: KEGG entry
- MetaCyc: metabolic pathway
- PRIAM: profile
- PDB structures: RCSB PDB PDBe PDBsum
- Gene Ontology: AmiGO / QuickGO
Search
- PMC: articles
- PubMed: articles
- NCBI: proteins

In enzymology, a hydrogen-sulfide S-acetyltransferase (EC 2.3.1.10) is an enzyme that catalyzes the chemical reaction

acetyl-CoA + hydrogen sulfide $\rightleftharpoons$ CoA + thioacetate

Thus, the two substrates of this enzyme are acetyl-CoA and hydrogen sulfide, whereas its two products are CoA and thioacetate.

This enzyme belongs to the family of transferases, specifically those acyltransferases transferring groups other than aminoacyl groups. The systematic name of this enzyme class is acetyl-CoA:hydrogen-sulfide S-acetyltransferase. This enzyme is also called hydrogen-sulfide acetyltransferase.
