= ADP-dependent short-chain-acyl-CoA hydrolase =

Identifiers
- EC no.: 3.1.2.18
- CAS no.: 117698-16-5

Databases
- IntEnz: IntEnz view
- BRENDA: BRENDA entry
- ExPASy: NiceZyme view
- KEGG: KEGG entry
- MetaCyc: metabolic pathway
- PRIAM: profile
- PDB structures: RCSB PDB PDBe PDBsum
- Gene Ontology: AmiGO / QuickGO
Search
- PMC: articles
- PubMed: articles
- NCBI: proteins

The enzyme ADP-dependent short-chain-acyl-CoA hydrolase (EC 3.1.2.18) catalyzes the reaction

acyl-CoA + H_{2}O $\rightleftharpoons$ CoA + a carboxylate

This enzyme belongs to the family of hydrolases, specifically those acting on thioester bonds. The systematic name of this enzyme class is ADP-dependent-short-chain-acyl-CoA hydrolase. Other names in common use include short-chain acyl coenzyme A hydrolase, propionyl coenzyme A hydrolase, propionyl-CoA hydrolase, propionyl-CoA thioesterase, short-chain acyl-CoA hydrolase, and short-chain acyl-CoA thioesterase. It employs one cofactor, ADP. At least one compound, NADH is known to inhibit this enzyme.
