= S-succinylglutathione hydrolase =

Class of enzymes

Identifiers
- EC no.: 3.1.2.13
- CAS no.: 50812-22-1

Databases
- BRENDA: enzyme data
- ExPASy: NiceZyme view
- KEGG: enzyme entry
- MetaCyc: metabolic pathway
- Rhea: reactions
- PDB structures: RCSB PDB PDBe PDBsum
- Gene Ontology: AmiGO / QuickGO
Search
- PMC: articles
- PubMed: articles
- NCBI: proteins

The enzyme S-succinylglutathione hydrolase (EC 3.1.2.13) catalyzes the reaction

S-succinylglutathione
H_{2}O
glutathione
+
succinic acid

The enzyme characterised from human liver hydrolyses S-succinylglutathione to glutathione and succinic acid, which forms the thioester in the starting material.

This enzyme is a hydrolase, specifically one acting on thioester bonds. The systematic name is S-succinylglutathione hydrolase.
