= CH2OS =

The molecular formula CH_{2}OS (molar mass: 62.09 g/mol, exact mass: 61.9826 u) may refer to:

- Thioformic acid, a thiocarboxylic acid
- Sulfine (sulfinylmethane)
