= Thioamide =

Class of organic compounds

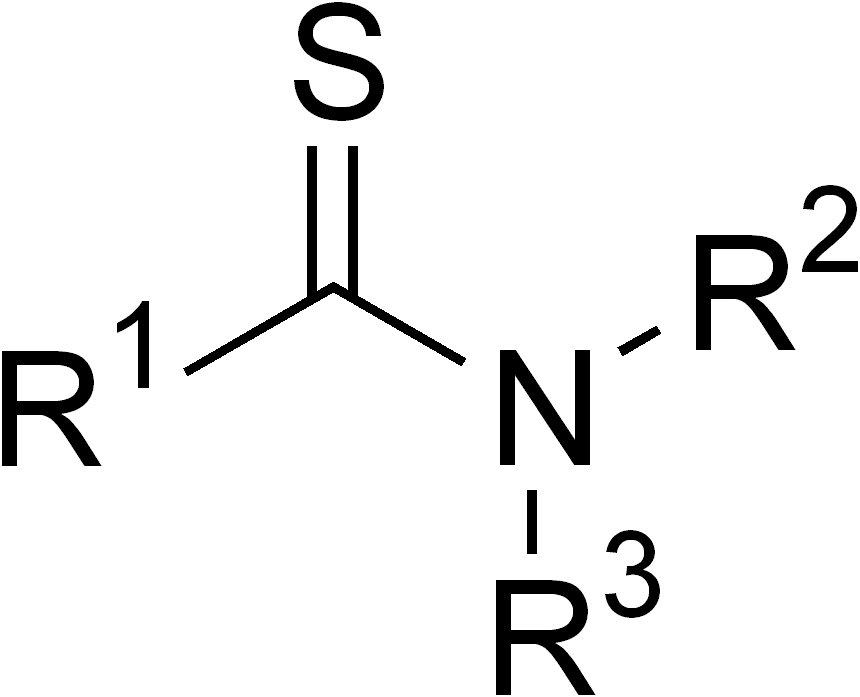
General structure of a thioamide

A thioamide (rarely, thionamide, but also known as thiourylenes) is a functional group with the general structure R^{1}−C(=S)−NR^{2}R^{3}, where R^{1}, R^{2} and R^{3} are any groups (typically organyl groups or hydrogen). Analogous to amides, thioamides exhibit greater multiple bond character along the C-N bond, resulting in a larger rotational barrier.

== Synthesis ==
Thioamides are typically prepared by treating amides with phosphorus pentasulfide, a reaction first described in the 1870s. An alternative to P_{2}S_{5} is its more soluble analogue Lawesson's reagent. These transformations can be seen in the synthesis of tolrestat.

=== Specialized methods ===
The Willgerodt-Kindler reaction provides a route to thioamides from aryl-alkyl ketones.

Nitriles react with hydrogen sulfide to afford thioamides. The reaction can be catalyzed by both base and acid:

Imidoyl chlorides react with hydrogen sulfide to produce thioamides.

Thioacylation is possible, but not with thioic acids, as amines preferentially displace the sulfur. Thionoesters form amidines with primary amines, but thioacylate secondary amines perfectly well. Thioketenes, dithiocarboxylic acids, and their thioesters attack amines of all sorts to give thioamides. The aryl acids react slowly, but much faster with a Hauser base. Trans-thioamidation is also possible, especially from a thiourea. Carbon acids attack isothiocyanates to give thioamides.

== Reactions ==
In the presence of silver and mercury salts, thioamides characteristally hydrolyze to give the amide:

RC(S)NH_{2} + H_{2}O + Hg(O_{2}CCH_{3})_{2} → RC(O)NH_{2} + 2 HO_{2}CCH_{3} + HgS

In qualitative inorganic analysis, thioacetamide is in fact used as a source of the sulfide ion.

Thioamides are Brønsted amphoteric, protonating at S and deprotonating at N or the α carbon. Strong nucleophiles may displace either substituent at the electrophilic carbon atom.

Conversely, electrophiles typically attack at N. Alkyl halides and alcohols attack either S or N, but often rearrange to a net S-alkylation. For example, the thioamide of azetidine slowly rearranges to the 1,3‑thiazadihydrothiazine.

More easily than the corresponding amides, thioamides oxidize and reduce. Although reduction with Raney nickel is popular, the reaction requires stoichiometric nickel, because the sulfur will poison any hydrogenation catalyst. Oxidation does not proceed past the quasi-sulfine.

Thioamides are precursors to heterocycles. Such approaches often exploit the nucleophilicity of the thione-like sulfur.

== Structure ==
The C(R)(N)(S) core of thioamides is planar. Using thioacetamide as representative: the C-S, C-N, and C-C distances are 1.68, 1.31, and 1.50 Å, respectively. The short C-S and C-N distances indicate multiple bonding.

RC(=S)NR'_{2} ↔ RC(−S^{−})=N^{+}R'_{2}

Nevertheless, thioamides do not protrope or form zwitterions, unless one of the R′ groups is an electron-donating heteroatom (e.g., in a thio-hydrazide).

Some thioamides exhibit the phenomenon of atropisomerism, reflecting the partial double bond character of their C-N bonds.

== In biochemistry and medicine ==
Ethionamide is a thioamide-based antibiotic used to treat tuberculosis

Thiopurines, mimics of purines, are used to treat a number of autoimmune diseases. Some thioamides are used to control thyrotoxicosis. They inhibit the enzyme thyroid peroxidase in the thyroid, suppressing the synthesis of triiodothyronine (T_{3}) and thyroxine (T_{4}), thereby blocking uptake of iodotyrosines from the colloid. They also block iodine release from peripheral hormone.

Thioamides have been incorporated into peptides as isosteres for the amide bond. Natural examples include the polythioamides: thioviridamide, thioholgamide A, and closthioamide.

Some herbicides are contain thioamide groups.

== Related compounds ==
Thioureas are a subset of thioamides. Some are items of commerce and some are bioactive.

Selenoamides are analogues of thioamides but with Se in place of S. They are uncommon.
