= S-Methyl thioacrylate =

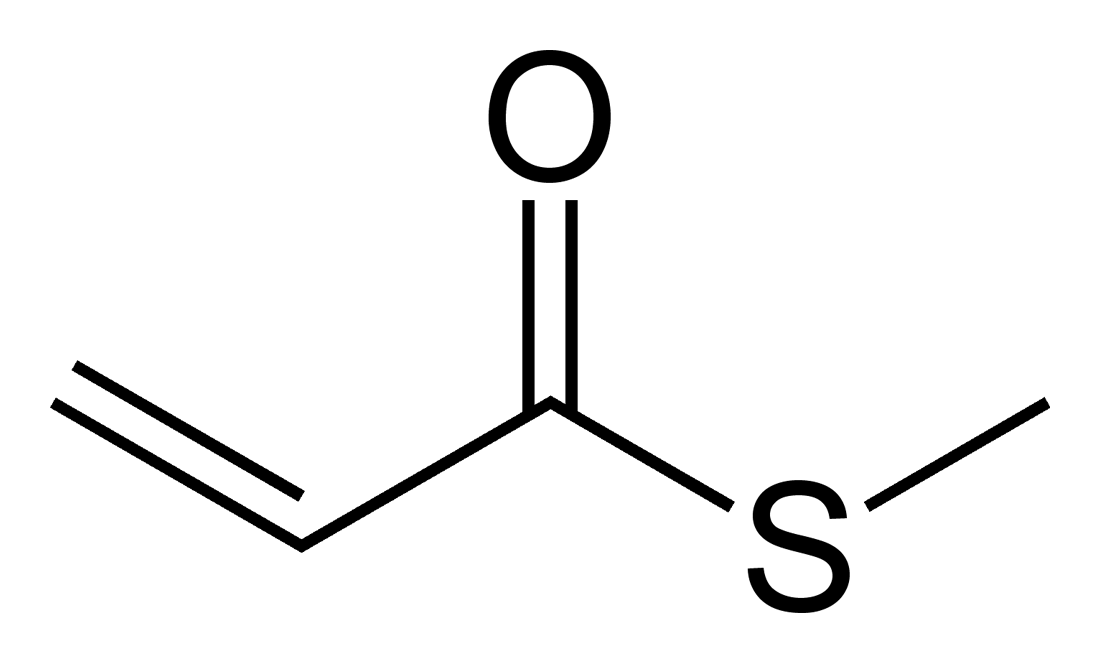

Names
- Other names 2-Propenethioic acid, S-methyl ester

Identifiers
CAS Number	5883-16-9
3D model (JSmol)	Interactive image
ChemSpider	472927
PubChem CID	543202
UNII	I79GYH3354
- InChI: InChI=1S/C4H6OS/c1-3-4(5)6-2/h3H,1H2,2H3 Key: PSJMMTZCYKGHJA-UHFFFAOYSA-N
- SMILES: CSC(=O)C=C

Properties
Chemical formula	C_{4}H_{6}OS
Molar mass	102.15 g·mol^{−1}
- Except where otherwise noted, data are given for materials in their standard state (at 25 °C [77 °F], 100 kPa). Infobox references

S-Methyl thioacrylate is an organosulfur compound and a thioester with the chemical formula CH_{2}=CHCOSCH_{3}. It is the S-ester formed between acrylic acid and methanethiol.

== Biological role ==
=== Asparagus metabolism ===
S-Methyl thioacrylate is one of the main metabolites responsible for the characteristic odor in the urine of some individuals after consuming asparagus. When asparagus is digested, its characteristic asparagusic acid is broken down into several sulfur-containing volatile compounds, including methanethiol, S-methyl-3-(methylthio)thiopropionate, and S-methyl thioacrylate. These compounds are excreted in the urine, producing a smell often described as similar to cooked cabbage. The ability to produce this odor, as well as the ability to perceive it, varies significantly among individuals due to genetic variations in both metabolic enzymes and olfactory receptors.

=== Food flavoring ===
In addition to its role as a metabolite, S-methyl thioacrylate is found as a natural product where it contributes to the aroma profile of certain foods. For example, it has been identified as a volatile constituent in the aroma of some fruits.

== Preparation ==
A common laboratory synthesis for thioesters such as S-methyl thioacrylate involves the reaction of an acyl chloride with a thiolate. Specifically, acryloyl chloride can be reacted with sodium thiomethoxide (the sodium salt of methanethiol) to produce the target compound.

== See also ==
- Thioester
- Methyl acrylate
- Asparagusic acid
