= Potassium pentasulfide =

Names
- Other names Dipotassium pentasulfide, dipotassium sulphide, potassium polysulfide

Identifiers
CAS Number	12136-50-4
3D model (JSmol)	Interactive image
PubChem CID	158619172
CompTox Dashboard (EPA)	DTXSID601311032
- InChI: InChI=1S/2K.H2S5/c;;1-3-5-4-2/h;;1-2H/q2*+1;/p-2 Key: HXTWSRHHRRWRDG-UHFFFAOYSA-L
- SMILES: [K+].[K+].[S-]SSS[S-]

Properties
Chemical formula	K_{2}S_{5}
Molar mass	238.50 g·mol^{−1}
Appearance	red-orange prisms

Structure
Crystal structure	orthorhombic
- Except where otherwise noted, data are given for materials in their standard state (at 25 °C [77 °F], 100 kPa). Infobox references

Potassium pentasulfide is the inorganic compound with the formula K_{2}S_{5}. It is a red-orange solid that dissolves in water. The salt decomposes rapidly in air. It is one of several polysulfide salts with the general formula M_{2}S_{n}, where M = Li, Na, K and n = 2, 3, 4, 5, 6. The polysulfide salts of potassium and sodium are similar.

== Preparation and reactions ==
The salt is prepared by the addition of elemental sulfur to potassium sulfide. An idealized equation is shown for potassium hydrosulfide:

4 KSH + S_{8} → 2 K_{2}S_{5} + 2 H_{2}S

The structure consists of zigzag chains of S^{2−}_{5} paired with K^{+} ions.

== Occurrence ==
Various polysulfides K_{2}S_{2} - K_{2}S_{6} are components of liver of sulfur. Polysulfides, like sulfides, can induce stress corrosion cracking in carbon steel and stainless steel.
