= Corey–Winter olefin synthesis =

Organic chemistry method

The Corey–Winter olefin synthesis (also known as Corey–Winter–Eastwood olefination) is a series of chemical reactions for converting 1,2-diols into olefins. It is named for the American chemist and Nobelist Elias James Corey and the American-Estonian chemist Roland Arthur Edwin Winter.

Corey-Winter Olefination

Often, thiocarbonyldiimidazole is used instead of thiophosgene as shown above, since thiophosgene has a similar toxicity profile as phosgene, whereas thiocarbonyldiimidazole is a much safer alternative.

== Mechanism ==
The reaction mechanism involves the formation of a cyclic thiocarbonate from the diol and thiophosgene. The second step involves treatment with trimethyl phosphite, which attacks the sulfur atom, producing S=P(OMe)_{3} (driven by the formation of a strong P=S double bond) and leaving a carbene. This carbene collapses with loss of carbon dioxide to give the olefin.

Proposed Mechanism of the Corey-Winter Olefination

An alternative mechanism does not involve a free carbene intermediate, but rather involves attack of the carbanion by a second molecule of trimethylphosphite with concomitant cleavage of the sulfur-carbon bond. The phosphorus stabilized carbanion then undergoes an elimination to give the alkene, along with an acyl phosphite, which then decarboxylates.

Alternative Mechanism

The Corey-Winter olefination is a stereospecific reaction: a trans-diol gives a trans-alkene, while a cis-diol gives a cis-alkene as the product. For instance, cis- and trans-1,2-cyclodecanediol gives the respective cis- and trans-cyclodecene.
