= Carbonyldiimidazole =

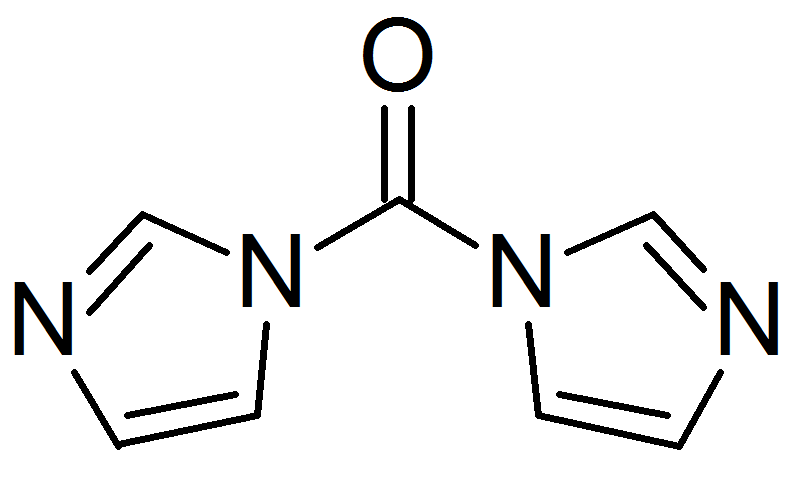

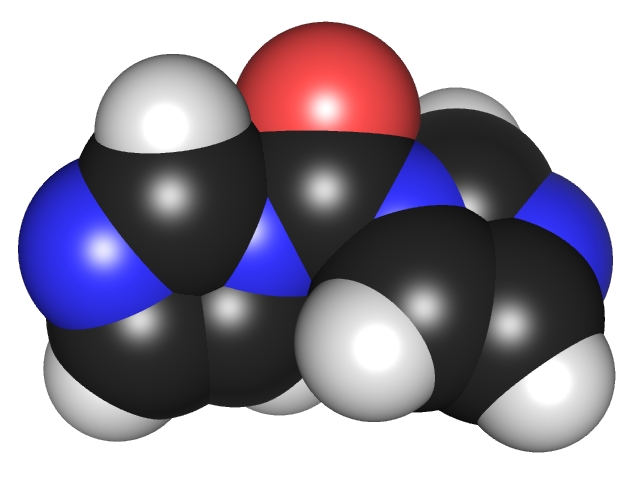

Names
- Preferred IUPAC name Di(1H-imidazol-1-yl)methanone
- Other names N,N'-carbonyldiimidazole; CDI; Staab reagent

Identifiers
CAS Number	530-62-1
3D model (JSmol)	Interactive image
ChemSpider	61561
ECHA InfoCard	100.007.718
EC Number	208-488-9
PubChem CID	68263
UNII	63A10X1FSP
CompTox Dashboard (EPA)	DTXSID9038761
- InChI: InChI=1S/C7H6N4O/c12-7(10-3-1-8-5-10)11-4-2-9-6-11/h1-6H Key: PFKFTWBEEFSNDU-UHFFFAOYSA-N; InChI=1/C7H6N4O/c12-7(10-3-1-8-5-10)11-4-2-9-6-11/h1-6H Key: PFKFTWBEEFSNDU-UHFFFAOYAX
- SMILES: O=C(n1cncc1)n2ccnc2

Properties
Chemical formula	C_{7}H_{6}N_{4}O
Molar mass	162.152 g·mol^{−1}
Appearance	White fine powder
Melting point	119 °C (246 °F; 392 K)
Solubility in water	decomposes

Hazards
- Occupational safety and health (OHS/OSH)
Main hazards	Corrosive to some metals, Causes serious chemical burns upon skin or eye contact.
- GHS labelling
Pictograms	(GHS05: Corrosive) (GHS07: Exclamation mark)
Signal word	Danger
Hazard statements	H302, H314, H315, H319
Precautionary statements	P260, P264, P270, P280, P301+P312, P301+P330+P331, P302+P352, P303+P361+P353, P304+P340, P305+P351+P338, P310, P321, P330, P332+P313, P337+P313, P362, P363, P405, P501
Safety data sheet (SDS)	External MSDS

Related compounds
Related compounds	phosgene, imidazole
- Except where otherwise noted, data are given for materials in their standard state (at 25 °C [77 °F], 100 kPa). verify (what is ?) Infobox references

1,1'-Carbonyldiimidazole (CDI) is an organic compound with the molecular formula (C_{3}H_{3}N_{2})_{2}CO. It is a white crystalline solid. It is often used for the coupling of amino acids for peptide synthesis and as a reagent in organic synthesis.

== Preparation ==
CDI can be prepared straightforwardly by the reaction of phosgene with four equivalents of imidazole under anhydrous conditions. Removal of the imidazolium chloride and solvent of the reaction mixture results in the crystalline product in ~90% yield.

4 C_{3}H_{4}N_{2} + C(O)Cl_{2} → (C_{3}H_{3}N_{2})_{2}CO + 2 [C_{3}H_{3}N_{2}H_{2}]Cl

In this conversion, the imidazole serves both as the nucleophile and the catalytic base. An alternative precursor 1-(trimethylsilyl)imidazole requires more preparative effort with the advantage that the coproduct trimethylsilyl chloride is volatile.

CDI hydrolyzes readily to give back imidazole:

(C_{3}H_{3}N_{2})_{2}CO + H_{2}O → 2 C_{3}H_{4}N_{2} + CO_{2}

The purity of CDI can be determined by the amount of CO_{2} gas that is formed upon exposure to water.

== Use in synthesis ==
CDI is mainly employed to convert amines into amides, carbamates, ureas. It can also be used to convert alcohols into esters.

=== Acid derivatives ===
The formation of amide is promoted by CDI. Although the reactivity of CDI is less than acid chlorides, it is more easily handled and avoids the use of thionyl chloride in acid chloride formation, which can cause side reactions. An early application of this type of reaction was noted in the formation of peptide bonds (with CO_{2} formation as a driving force). The proposed mechanism for the reaction between a carboxylic acid and CDI is presented below.

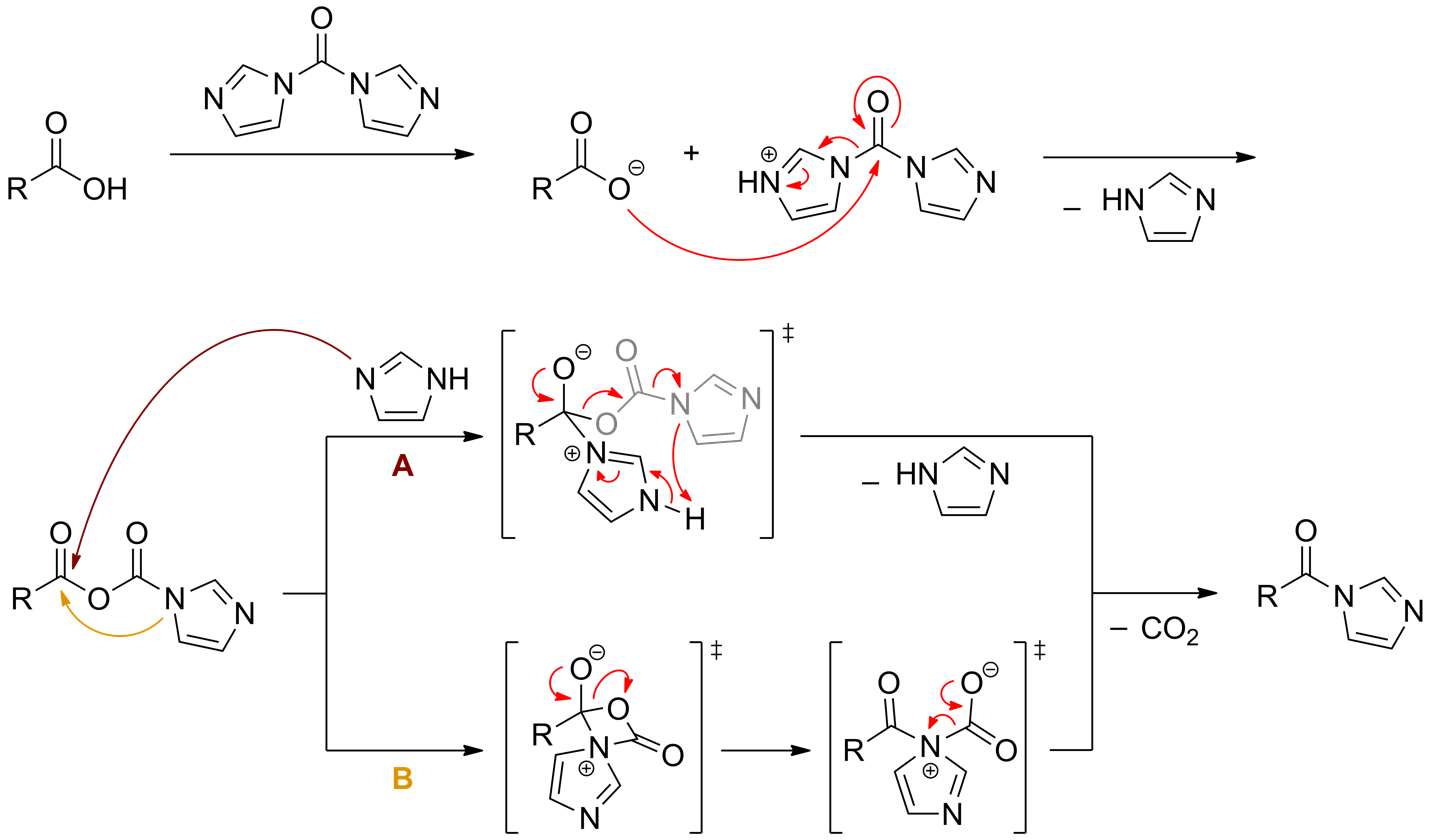

In the realm of peptide synthesis, this product may be treated with an amine such as that found on an amino acid to release the imidazole group and couple the peptides. The side products, carbon dioxide and imidazole, are relatively innocuous. Racemization of the amino acids also tends to be minimal, reflecting the mild reaction conditions.

CDI can also be used for esterification, although alcoholysis requires heat or the presence of a potent nucleophiles as sodium ethoxide, or other strong bases like NaH. This reaction has generally good yield and wide scope, although forming the ester from tertiary alcohols when the acid reagent has a relatively acidic α-proton is troublesome, since C-C condensations can occur, though this itself may be a desirable reaction. A similar reaction involving thiols and selenols can yield the corresponding esters. The alcohol reaction can also be used to form glycosidic bonds.

Similarly, an acid can be used in the place of an alcohol to form the anhydride, although dicyclohexylcarbodiimide is a more typical reagent. The equilibrium can be shifted in the favor of the anhydride by utilizing an acid in a 2:1 ratio that forms an insoluble salt with the imidazole. Typical acids are trifluoro- and trichloroacetic acids. Symmetric anhydrides can thus be formed by replacing this trifluoro- or trichloroacetyl group with the acid that was used to form the original reagent.

Another related reaction is the reaction of formic acid with CDI to form the formylized imidazole. This reagent is a good formylating agent and can regenerate the unsubstituted imidazole (with formation of carbon monoxide) upon heating.

Yet another reaction involves the acylation of triphenylalkelynephosphoranes.

(C_{6}H_{5})_{3}P=CHR + R'−CO−Im → (C_{6}H_{5})_{3}P^{+}−CHR−COR' + Im^{−}
(C_{6}H_{5})_{3}P^{+}−CHR−COR' + (C_{6}H_{5})_{3}P=CHR → (C_{6}H_{5})_{3}P=CR−COR' + (C_{6}H_{5})_{3}P^{+}−CH_{2}R

These can undergo the Wittig reaction to form α,β unsaturated ketones or aldehydes.

The reagent can even undergo reaction with peroxide to form the peroxycarboxylic acid, which can react further to form diacyl peroxides. The imidazole group is also reduced by LiAlH_{4} to form aldehydes from the carboxylic acid (rather than amines or alcohols). The reagent can also be reacted with Grignard reagents to form ketones.

A C-C acylation reaction can occur with a malonic ester-type compound, in the following scheme useful for syntheses of macrolide antibiotics.

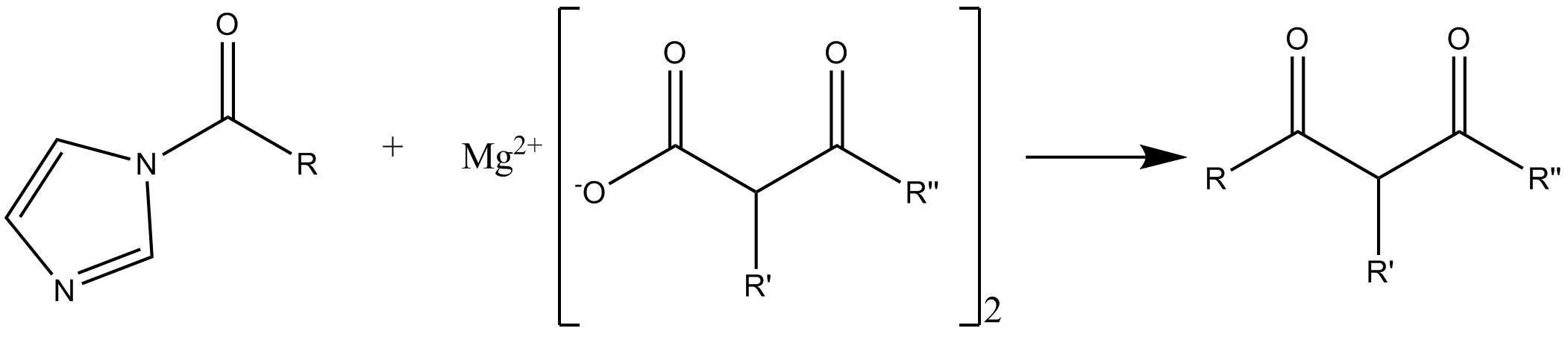

=== Other reactions ===
The N-phenylimino derivative of CDI can be formed in a Wittig-like reaction with triphenylphosphine phenylimide.

OCIm_{2} + Ph_{3}P=NPh → PhN=CIm_{2} + Ph_{3}PO

CDI can act as a carbonyl equivalent in the formation of tetronic acids or pulvinones from hydroxyketones and diketones in basic conditions.

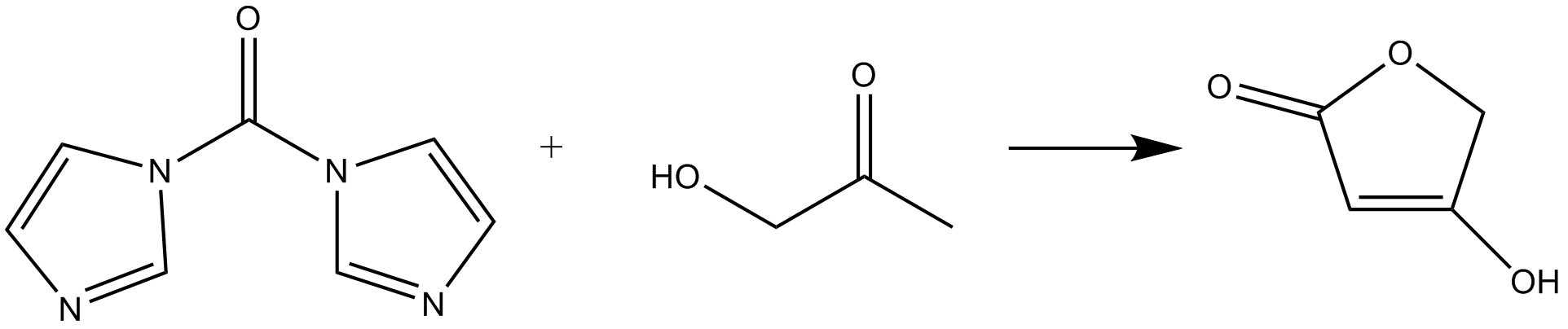

An alcohol treated with at least 3 equivalents of an activated halide (such as allyl bromide or iodomethane) and CDI yields the corresponding halide with good yield. Bromination and iodination work best, though this reaction does not preserve the stereochemistry of the alcohol. In a similar context, CDI is often used in dehydration reactions.

As CDI is an equivalent of phosgene, it can be used in similar reaction, however, with increased selectivity: it allows the synthesis of asymmetric bis alkyl carbonates

== Safety ==
The safety characteristics of CDI have been investigated as part of a broader evaluation of amide bond forming reagents. CDI was demonstrated to exhibit dermal corrosion and eye irritation. The sensitization potential of CDI was shown to be low compared to other common amide bond forming agents (non-sensitizing at 1% in LLNA testing according to OECD 429). Thermal hazard analysis by differential scanning calorimetry (DSC) shows CDI poses minimal explosion risks.

== See also ==
- Thiocarbonyldiimidazole (TCDI) the thiourea analogue
