= Dithiocarboxylic acid =

Dithiocarboxylic acids are organosulfur compounds with the formula RCS_{2}H. They are the dithia analogues of carboxylic acids. A closely related and better studied family of compounds are the monothiocarboxylic acids, with the formula RCOSH.

Dithiocarboxylic acids are about 3x more acidic than the monothiocarboxylic acids. Thus, for dithiobenzoic acid pK_{a} = 1.92. Contrariwise, they do not exhibit hydrogen bonding.

Such compounds are commonly prepared by the reaction of carbon disulfide with a Grignard reagent:

RMgX + CS_{2} → RCS_{2}MgX
RCS_{2}MgX + HCl → RCS_{2}H + MgXCl

This reaction is comparable to the formation of carboxylic acids using a Grignard reagent and carbon dioxide.

Nitrogen derivatives substitute onto dithioic acids similar to the monothioic and carboxylic acids. Thus amines ammonolyze to thioamides or amidines, hydrazines to thio-hydrazides, and hydroxylamines to thio-hydroxamic acids or nitriles. Likewise, unsaturated (i.e., allylic, vinylic, propargylic, or acetylenic) Grignard reagents attack dithioesters with an allylic shift much like a traditional Grignard reaction. In other cases, the carbonyl polarity is reversed: thus saturated Grignards alkylate the sulfur atoms to form a dithioacetal carbanion. Ketonic dithioesters react at the dithioester first, before the resulting carbanion attacks the ketone to form a cyclic alcohol.

Aryldithiocarboxylic acids, e.g., dithiobenzoic acid, chlorinate to give the thioacyl chlorides. Oxygen transfer from e.g. air to a dithiocarboxylate ester gives a sulfine-like S-oxide that rearranges to an acyl disulfide. Dithiocarboxylate salts readily S-alkylate to give dithiocarboxylate esters:

RCS_{2}Na + R'Cl → RCS_{2}R' + NaCl

Dithioketene acetals (i.e., dithioate enol dithioethers) are nucleophilic at the sulfur atoms, not the α carbon.
