= Ethyl thioacetate =

S-Ethyl thioacetate

Names
- IUPAC name S-Ethyl ethanethioate
- Other names S-ethyl thioacetate, S-ethyl thiolacetate

Identifiers
CAS Number	625-60-5
3D model (JSmol)	Interactive image
ChEBI	CHEBI:179440
ChemSpider	55117
ECHA InfoCard	100.009.914
EC Number	210-904-9
PubChem CID	61171
UNII	6E715F929W
CompTox Dashboard (EPA)	DTXSID5060807
- InChI: InChI=1S/C4H8OS/c1-3-6-4(2)5/h3H2,1-2H3 Key: APTGPWJUOYMUCE-UHFFFAOYSA-N
- SMILES: CCSC(=O)C

Properties
Chemical formula	C_{4}H_{8}OS
Molar mass	104.17 g·mol^{−1}
Appearance	colorless liquid
Density	0.971 g/cm³
Solubility in water	insoluble
Solubility	diethyl ether, ethanol
Refractive index (n_{D})	1.456-1.468

Hazards
- GHS labelling
Pictograms	(GHS02: Flammable) (GHS05: Corrosive) (GHS07: Exclamation mark)
Signal word	Warning
Hazard statements	H225, H302, H315, H318, H335
Precautionary statements	P210, P233, P240, P241, P242, P243, P261, P264, P264+P265, P270, P271, P280, P301+P317, P302+P352, P303+P361+P353, P304+P340, P305+P354+P338, P317, P319, P321, P330, P332+P317, P362+P364, P370+P378, P403+P233, P403+P235, P405, P501
- Except where otherwise noted, data are given for materials in their standard state (at 25 °C [77 °F], 100 kPa). Infobox references

S-Ethyl thioacetate is the organosulfur compound with the formula CH_{3}C(O)SC_{2}H_{5}. It is an ethyl ester of thioacetic acid. The compound is traditionally prepared by alkylation of potassium thioacetate and thiolation of acetyl chloride:

CH_{3}COSK + C_{2}H_{5}Br → CH_{3}C(O)SC_{2}H_{5} + KBr
CH_{3}COCl + C_{2}H_{5}SH → CH_{3}C(O)SC_{2}H_{5} + HCl

The compound has been well studied in part as a model for biologically relevant thioesters, such as Coenzyme A. H-D exchange of the methyl group has been examined in aqueous solution.

== Related compounds ==
- O-Ethyl thioacetate (C_{2}H_{5}OC(S)CH_{3}) is the unstable isomer of S-ethyl thioacetate
