= Liver of sulfur =

Type of chemical mixture

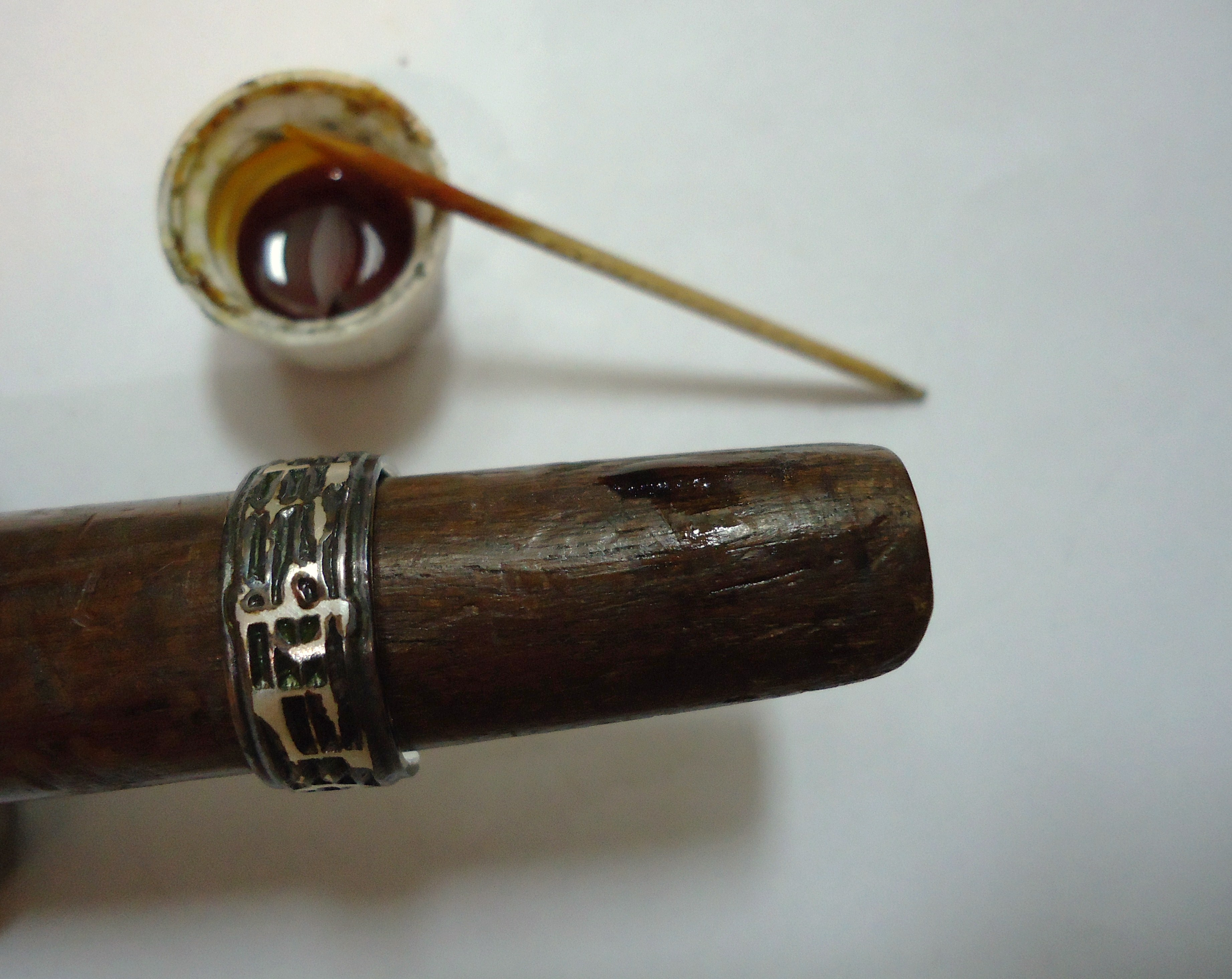
Oxidizing silver with liver of sulfur solution

Liver of sulfur is a loosely defined mixture of potassium sulfide, potassium polysulfide, potassium thiosulfate, and likely potassium bisulfide. Synonyms include hepar sulfuris, sulfurated potash and sulfurated potassa. There are two distinct varieties: "potassic liver of sulfur" and "ammoniacal liver of sulfur". It is traditionally used as an oxidising agent in metalwork.

== Chemistry ==
Liver of sulfur can be created by reacting potassium carbonate (traditionally called pearlash) with an excess of elemental sulfur in an oxygenated environment. The sulfur disproportionates and the resulting compounds include potassium thiosulfate, an oxidising agent, and potassium sulfide. When exposed to air and light, it tends to decompose over time to potassium carbonate and potassium sulfate, neither of which has any oxidizing power.

Sulfur heated with potassium carbonate in open air partially oxidises to form the oxidising agent liver of sulfur, in addition to the byproduct off-gassed carbon dioxide. The excess sulfur burns off as sulfur dioxide.

When it spoils, it reacts with carbon dioxide and water vapor to form simple -ate salts by off-gassing hydrogen sulfide.

In the traditional view, no redox occurs in this reaction, but experimental evidence regarding the oxidation states of sulfur in thiosulfate ions indicates that the sulfur experience further redox disproportionation in this reaction, from oxidation states of −1 and +5 to −2 and +6.

4 K_{2}CO_{3} + 6/8 S_{8} + O_{2} → 2 K_{2}S_{2}O_{3}·K_{2}S + 4 CO_{2}

1/8 S_{8} + O_{2} → SO_{2}

K_{2}S_{2}O_{3}·K_{2}S + CO_{2} + 2 H_{2}O → K_{2}CO_{3} + K_{2}SO_{4} + 2 H_{2}S

== Physical properties ==
It is sold as a yellow brittle solid (a "lump" which must be mixed with water before use) as well as a pre-mixed liquid and a gel form. The solid is believed to have the longest shelf life, though all liver of sulfur tends to decompose with time. Modern gel forms contain stabilizers that allow the reactivity to last much longer. Liver of sulfur that is kept dry, sealed from air, out of the light, and in a freezer will last many times longer than that kept in any other condition.

The highest quality liver of sulfur in solid form is a dark yellow, almost "liver" colored substance. As it ages and is exposed to air, its potency decreases, it will turn lighter yellow and finally white, at which point it has fully decomposed to a form with negligible reactivity.

== Usage ==
=== Metalworking ===
Liver of sulfur is mainly used in metalworking to form a brown or black patina on copper and silver as well as many (though not all) copper alloys and silver alloys (brass, for example— a copper alloy— does not react with sulfur compounds).

As it ages and is exposed to air, it increasingly decomposes to sulfate of potash and carbonate of potash, neither of which has any value as an oxidizer of metal.

The reactivity of liver of sulfur with silver and copper quickly creates a dark or colored patina on the metal. This is done by immersing the metal object in a solution of liver of sulfur and water. When treating silver, the solution must be hot, though if the bath is brought to its boiling point the liver of sulfur will quickly decompose and become ineffective. Also, if the concentration of the solution is too strong, the oxidation process will proceed too quickly and the layer of patina thus created will tend to flake away. The best results are usually obtained by using more dilute solutions and allowing the patina to build more slowly but more securely, and, for silver, keeping the solution just under its boiling point. Lastly, it is critical that the metal surface be extremely clean, as clean as would be necessary to electroplate the same surface. Even small amounts of oil on the metal such as that produced by handling without gloves will be sufficient to protect the metal surface from oxidation.

=== Medical use ===
Liver of sulfur was once -- no longer, because it is toxic -- used to counteract poisoning with several metals, including arsenic, copper, lead, and antimony. A lump was dissolved in warm water and the patient was instructed to drink the solution three or four times over the course of an hour. At one time sulfurated potash was used to combat arthritis. It eventually fell into disfavor for medical purposes because sulfides and polysulfides were discovered to be toxic in their own right.
