= O-Ethyl thioacetate =

Names
- IUPAC name O-Ethyl ethanethioate
- Other names Ethyl thionacetate

Identifiers
CAS Number	926-67-0
3D model (JSmol)	Interactive image
ChemSpider	120473
PubChem CID	926-67-0
CompTox Dashboard (EPA)	DTXSID10239066
- InChI: InChI=1S/C4H8OS/c1-3-5-4(2)6/h3H2,1-2H3 Key: IEPFHYMMMGMRNF-UHFFFAOYSA-N
- SMILES: CCOC(=S)C

Properties
Chemical formula	C_{4}H_{8}OS
Molar mass	104.17 g·mol^{−1}
Appearance	colorless liquid
Density	0.957 g/cm³
Melting point	105–109 °C (221–228 °F; 378–382 K)
Refractive index (n_{D})	1.4579
- Except where otherwise noted, data are given for materials in their standard state (at 25 °C [77 °F], 100 kPa). Infobox references

O-Ethyl thioacetate is an organosulfur compound with the formula C_{2}H_{5}OC(S)CH_{3}. It is the unstable isomer of S-ethyl thioacetate. It is prepared by treatment of the iminoester with hydrogen sulfide:

CH_{3}C(=NH)OC_{2}H_{5} + H_{2}S → CH_{3}C(=S)OC_{2}H_{5} + NH_{3}

The orthoester also reacts usefully with hydrogen sulfide in the presence of ferric chloride as a catalyst:

CH_{3}C(OC_{2}H_{5})_{3} + H_{2}S → CH_{3}C(=S)OC_{2}H_{5} + 2 HOC_{2}H_{5}

== Related compounds ==
- Ethyl thioacetate (C_{2}H_{5}SC(O)CH_{3}) is the stable isomer of O-ethyl thioacetate.
