= Thioformic acid =

Names
- IUPAC name Methanethioic S-acid
- Other names Monothioformic acid

Identifiers
CAS Number	16890-80-5
3D model (JSmol)	Interactive image; Interactive image
ChemSpider	452997
PubChem CID	519335
CompTox Dashboard (EPA)	DTXSID30333974
- InChI: InChI=1S/CH2OS/c2-1-3/h1H,(H,2,3) Key: AWIJRPNMLHPLNC-UHFFFAOYSA-N
- SMILES: C(=O)S; S=CO

Properties
Chemical formula	CH_{2}OS
Molar mass	62.09 g·mol^{−1}
Boiling point	86 °C (187 °F; 359 K)
- Except where otherwise noted, data are given for materials in their standard state (at 25 °C [77 °F], 100 kPa). Infobox references

Thioformic acid is a chemical compound with the molecular formula CH_{2}OS. As the simplest thiocarboxylic acid, it has been the subject of studies on its properties which may be extrapolated to more complex thiocarboxylic acids.

Like other thiocarboxylic acids, thioformic acid can occur in either of two tautomers. The ratio of the two is dependent on solvent and other factors.

Thioformic acid has been detected in the interstellar medium near the giant molecular cloud G+0.693–0.027 and the hot core G31.41+0.31.
