= Potassium thioacetate =

Organosulfur compound (CH3COS- K+)

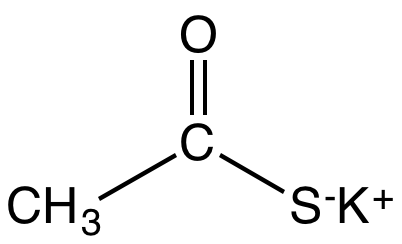

Identifiers
CAS Number	10387-40-3
3D model (JSmol)	Interactive image
ChemSpider	74542
ECHA InfoCard	100.030.759
EC Number	233-848-7
MeSH	C005732
PubChem CID	4463282
UNII	ZY58K327HN
CompTox Dashboard (EPA)	DTXSID0065060
- InChI: InChI=1S/C2H4OS.K/c1-2(3)4;/h1H3,(H,3,4);/q;+1/p-1 Key: AFNBMGLGYSGFEZ-UHFFFAOYSA-M
- SMILES: CC(=O)[S-].[K+]

Properties
Chemical formula	C_{2}H_{3}KOS
Molar mass	114.21
Appearance	white solid
Solubility in water	good
- Except where otherwise noted, data are given for materials in their standard state (at 25 °C [77 °F], 100 kPa). Infobox references

Potassium thioacetate is an organosulfur compound and a salt with the formula CH_{3}COS^{−}K^{+}. This white, water-soluble solid is used as a reagent for preparing thioacetate esters and other derivatives.

== Synthesis and reactions ==
Potassium thioacetate, which is commercially available, can be prepared by combining acetyl chloride and potassium hydrosulfide:

CH_{3}COCl + 2 KSH → KCl + CH_{3}COSK + H_{2}S

It arises also by the neutralisation of thioacetic acid with potassium hydroxide.

== Use in preparation of thiols ==
In a common application, potassium thioacetate is combined with alkylating agents to give thioacetate esters (X = halide):

CH_{3}COSK + RX → CH_{3}COSR + KX

One example is ethyl thioacetate. Hydrolysis of these esters affords thiols:

CH_{3}COSR + H_{2}O → CH_{3}CO_{2}H + RSH

The thioacetate esters can also undergo cleavage with methanethiol in the presence of stoichiometric base, as illustrated in the preparation of pent-4-yne-1-thiol:

H_{3}C(CH_{2})_{3}OMs + KSAc → H_{3}C(CH_{2})_{3}SAc + KOMs
H_{3}C(CH_{2})_{3}SAc + HSMe → H_{3}C(CH_{2})_{3}SH + MeSAc
