= Thiophosgene =

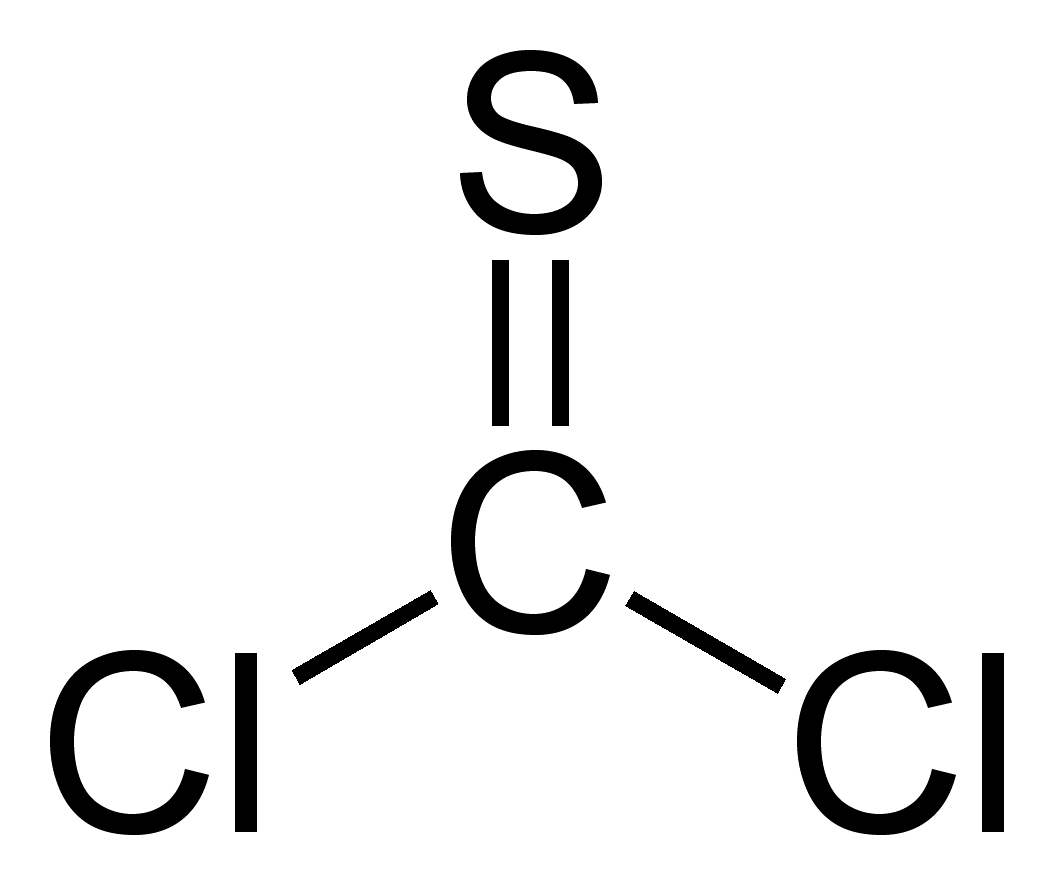
Thiophosgene
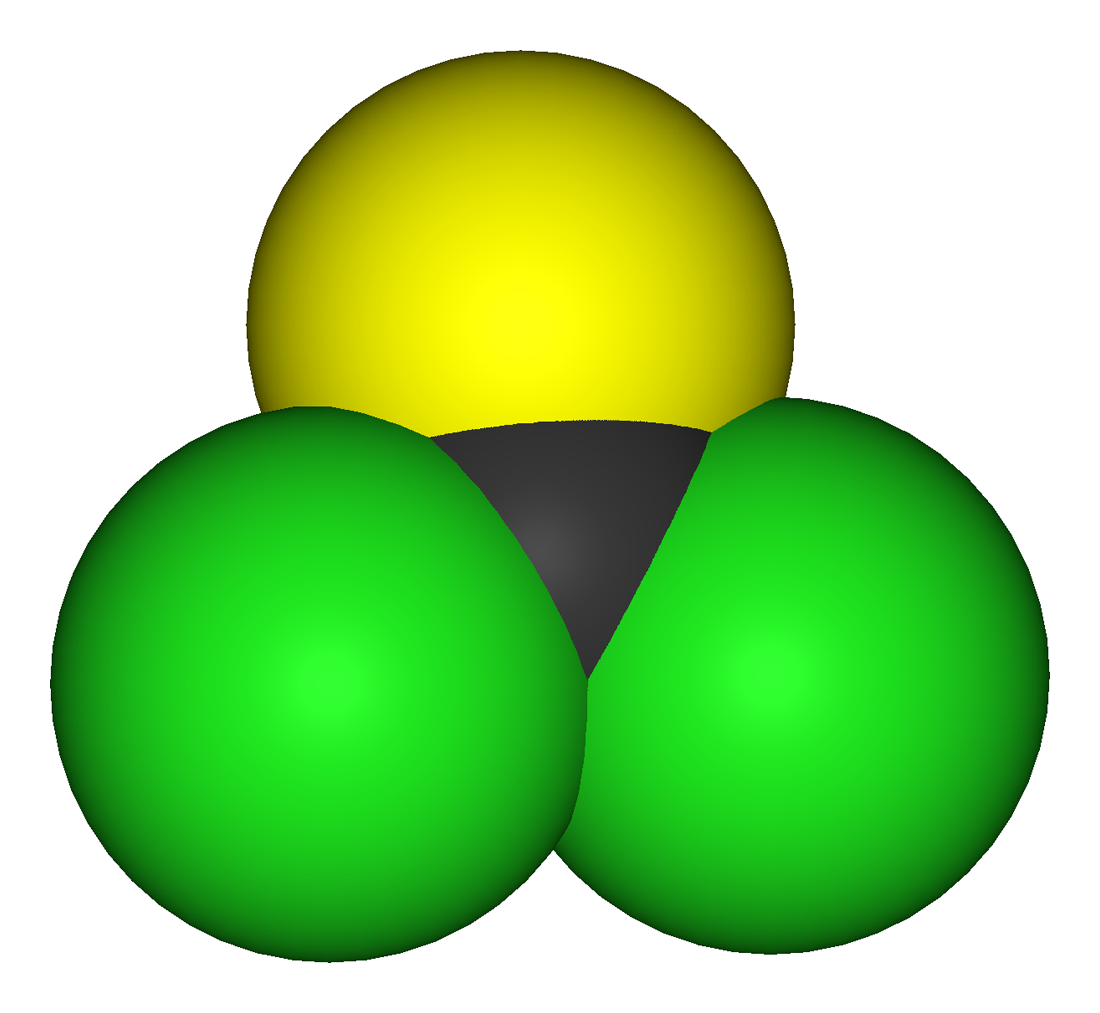
Thiophosgene
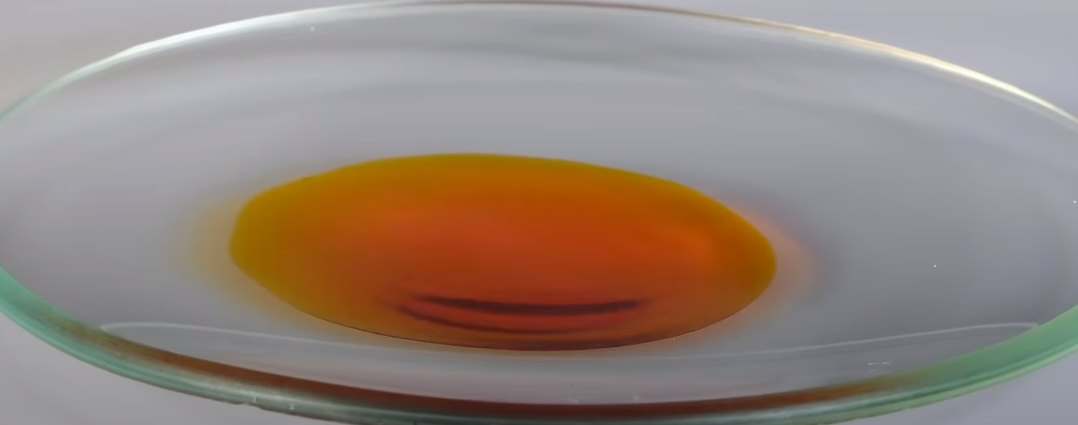

Names
- IUPAC name Carbonothioyl dichloride
- Other names Thiophosgene; Thiocarbonyl chloride; Carbonothioic dichloride

Identifiers
CAS Number	463-71-8
3D model (JSmol)	Interactive image
ChEBI	CHEBI:29366
ChemSpider	9645
ECHA InfoCard	100.006.675
PubChem CID	10040
RTECS number	XN2450000
UNII	067FQP576P
CompTox Dashboard (EPA)	DTXSID2060046
- InChI: InChI=1S/CCl2S/c2-1(3)4 Key: ZWZVWGITAAIFPS-UHFFFAOYSA-N; InChI=1/CCl2S/c2-1(3)4 Key: ZWZVWGITAAIFPS-UHFFFAOYAH
- SMILES: ClC(Cl)=S

Properties
Chemical formula	CSCl_{2}
Molar mass	114.97 g·mol^{−1}
Appearance	Red liquid
Odor	Persistent, choking odor
Density	1.50 g/cm^{3}
Boiling point	70 to 75 °C (158 to 167 °F; 343 to 348 K)
Solubility in water	Decomposes
Solubility in other solvents	Reacts with amines and alcohols, soluble in polar organic solvents
Magnetic susceptibility (χ)	−50.6·10^{−6} cm^{3}/mol
Refractive index (n_{D})	1.558

Structure
Molecular shape	planar, sp^{2}, C_{2v}

Hazards
- Occupational safety and health (OHS/OSH)
Main hazards	Highly toxic
Flash point	62 °C (144 °F; 335 K)

Related compounds
Related compounds	Phosgene; Thiocarbonyl fluoride; Thiocarbonyl bromide; Sulfur dichloride; Thionyl chloride
- Except where otherwise noted, data are given for materials in their standard state (at 25 °C [77 °F], 100 kPa). verify (what is ?) Infobox references

Thiophosgene is a red liquid with the formula CSCl_{2}. It is a molecule with trigonal planar geometry. There are two reactive C–Cl bonds that allow it to be used in diverse organic syntheses.

== Preparation ==
Typically, CSCl_{2} is prepared in a two-step process from carbon disulfide. In the first step, carbon disulfide is chlorinated to give trichloromethanesulfenyl chloride (CCl_{3}SCl), a rare sulfenyl chloride:

2 CS_{2} + 5 Cl_{2} → 2 CCl_{3}SCl + S_{2}Cl_{2}

The chlorination must be controlled as excess chlorine converts trichloromethanesulfenyl chloride into carbon tetrachloride. Steam distillation separates the trichloromethanesulfenyl chloride and hydrolyzes the disulfur dichloride. Reduction of trichloromethanesulfenyl chloride with, e.g., tin or dihydroanthracene produces thiophosgene:

CCl_{3}SCl + M → CSCl_{2} + MCl_{2}

An alternative one-step reaction is

CCl_{4} + H_{2}S → SCCl_{2} + 2 HCl

== Reactions ==
CSCl_{2} is mainly used to prepare compounds with the connectivity CSX_{2} where X = OR, NHR. Such reactions proceed via intermediate such as CSClX. Under certain conditions, one can convert primary amines into isothiocyanates. CSCl_{2} also serves as a dienophile to give, after reduction 5-thiacyclohexene derivatives. Thiophosgene is also known as the appropriate reagent in Corey-Winter synthesis for stereospecific conversion of 1,2-diols into alkenes.

It forms a head-to-tail dimer upon irradiation with UV light:

2 CSCl_{2} → S_{2}(CCl_{2})_{2}

Unlike thiophosgene monomer, a red liquid, the photodimer, an example of a 1,3-dithietane, is a colourless solid. Swarts fluorination of the dimer and then cracking is the principal route to thiocarbonyl fluoride.

Thiophosgene decomposes at 200 °C or above to form carbon disulfide and carbon tetrachloride. It has also been observed decomposing to hydrogen sulfide, hydrogen chloride, and carbonyl sulfide gases via contact with human tissue.

== Toxicology and safety ==
CSCl_{2} is considered highly toxic. Inhalation of the substance can cause irritation of respiratory system, burns, delayed pulmonary edema and death.

== See also ==
- Phosgene
- Carbonyl fluoride
- Sulfur dichloride
- Thiocarbonyldiimidazole
