= 1,4-Oxathiane =

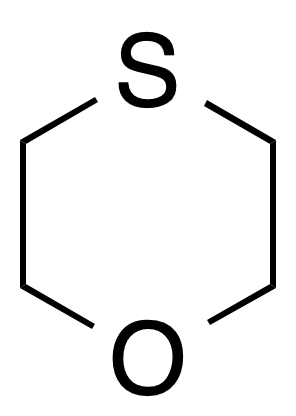

Names
- Preferred IUPAC name 1,4-Oxathiane
- Other names 1,4-Thioxane; p-Thioxane; 1-Oxa-4-thiacyclohexane

Identifiers
CAS Number	15980-15-1
3D model (JSmol)	Interactive image
ChemSpider	25685
ECHA InfoCard	100.036.454
EC Number	240-117-6
PubChem CID	27596
UNII	2X66H33V2V
CompTox Dashboard (EPA)	DTXSID0065985
- InChI: InChI=1S/C4H8OS/c1-3-6-4-2-5-1/h1-4H2 Key: JBYHSSAVUBIJMK-UHFFFAOYSA-N
- SMILES: C1CSCCO1

Properties
Chemical formula	C_{4}H_{8}OS
Molar mass	104.17 g·mol^{−1}
Melting point	−17 °C (1 °F; 256 K)
Boiling point	147.0 °C (296.6 °F; 420.1 K)

Hazards
- GHS labelling
Pictograms	(GHS02: Flammable) (GHS07: Exclamation mark)
Signal word	Warning
Hazard statements	H226, H315, H319, H335
Precautionary statements	P210, P233, P240, P241, P242, P243, P261, P264, P271, P280, P302+P352, P303+P361+P353, P304+P340, P305+P351+P338, P312, P321, P332+P313, P337+P313, P362, P370+P378, P403+P233, P403+P235, P405, P501
- Lethal dose or concentration (LD, LC)
LD_{50} (median dose)	2830 mg/kg oral rat

Related compounds
Related compounds	1,4-dioxane
- Except where otherwise noted, data are given for materials in their standard state (at 25 °C [77 °F], 100 kPa). Infobox references

1,4-Oxathiane is a heterocyclic compound containing one oxygen atom and one sulfur atom at opposite corners of a saturated six-membered ring. By systematic numbering, the oxygen atom is position number 1, sulfur is number 4, and positions 2, 3, 5, and 6 are carbon atoms.

== Production ==
1,4-Oxathiane can be produced from low cost ingredients by heating ethylene glycol or ethylene oxide with hydrogen sulfide. Alternate ways are to dehydrate bis(hydroxy ethyl) sulfide by heating with potassium hydrogen sulfate. These reactions also form 1,4-dithiane as a byproduct.

The original 1912 preparation of 1,4-oxathiane involved iodoethyl ether with potassium sulfide in alcohol. A similar method used 2-chloroethyl ether.

== Reactions ==
The sulfur atom in 1,4-oxathiane can undergo reaction as other substituted sulfides can. It can be oxidised to a sulfoxide with calcium hypochlorite or sodium periodate, or continuing to a sulfone.

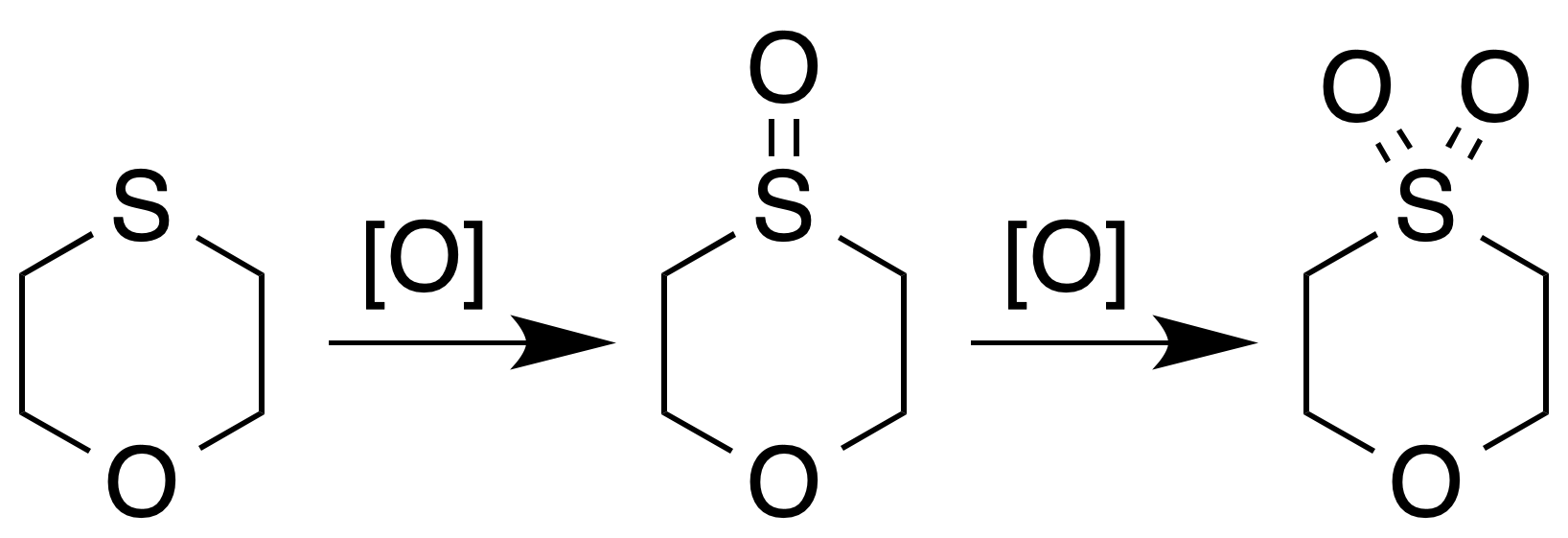

It can react with ammonia to form diimines.

With elemental chlorine below 0 °C, 3-chloro-1,4-oxathiane is formed. Above 0 °C, 2,3-dichloro-1,4-oxathiane results and further chlorination yields 2,3,5,6-tetrachloro-1,4-oxathiane.

With hydrofluoric acid, 1,4-oxathiane is undergoes electrophilic fluorination to yield perfluoro-1,4-oxathiane: all eight hydrogen atoms are replaced with fluorine substituents, and also four fluorine atoms are attached to the sulfur atom.

With elemental bromine in ether, an oxathianium salt is formed. In this an extra bromine atom bonds to the sulfur atom which gets a positive charge. To balance this, a bromide ion forms to make up a salt. Similarly iodine in acetic acid reacts to make 4-iodo-1,4-oxathianium iodide. Heating 1,4-oxathiane with ethyl iodide yields 4-ethyl-1,4-oxathianium iodide.
