= Thioacetic acid =

Organosulfur compound (CH3C(O)SH)

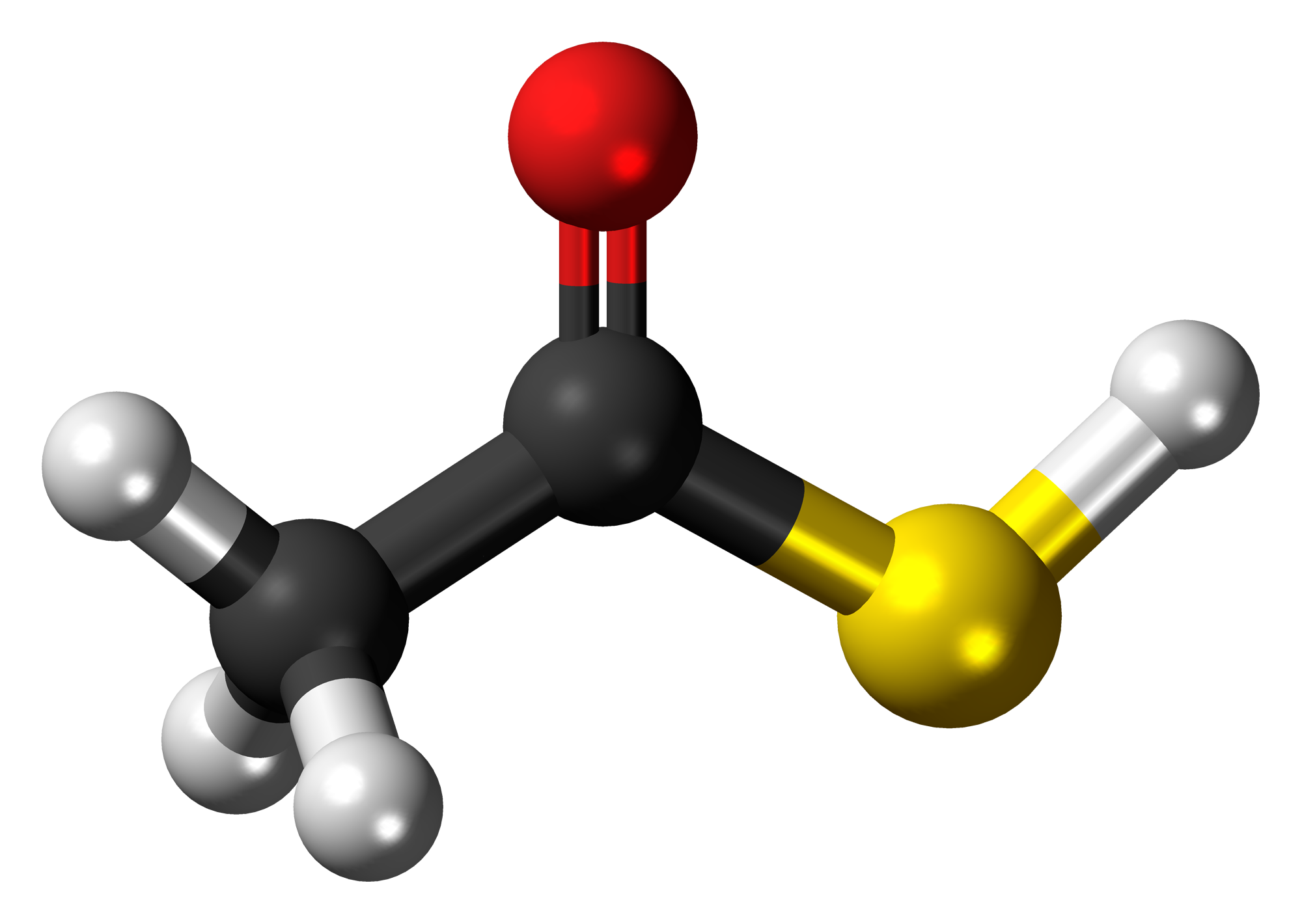

Names
- Preferred IUPAC name Ethanethioic S-acid
- Other names Thioacetic S-acid; Thiolacetic acid

Identifiers
CAS Number	507-09-5
3D model (JSmol)	Interactive image
ChEBI	CHEBI:46800
ChemSpider	10052
ECHA InfoCard	100.007.331
KEGG	C01857
PubChem CID	10484
UNII	PS92MLC0FQ
CompTox Dashboard (EPA)	DTXSID5060142
- InChI: InChI=1S/C2H4OS/c1-2(3)4/h1H3,(H,3,4) Key: DUYAAUVXQSMXQP-UHFFFAOYSA-N; InChI=1/C2H4OS/c1-2(3)4/h1H3,(H,3,4) Key: DUYAAUVXQSMXQP-UHFFFAOYAO
- SMILES: O=C(S)C

Properties
Chemical formula	C_{2}H_{4}OS
Molar mass	76.11 g·mol^{−1}
Appearance	Transparent, colorless to light yellow liquid
Odor	Unpleasant, strong thiol-like
Density	1.08 g/mL
Melting point	−58 °C (−72 °F; 215 K)
Boiling point	93 °C (199 °F; 366 K)
Magnetic susceptibility (χ)	−38.4·10^{−6} cm^{3}/mol
Refractive index (n_{D})	1.465

Hazards
- Occupational safety and health (OHS/OSH)
Main hazards	May cause severe skin and eye burns. Highly flammable liquid.
- GHS labelling
Pictograms	(GHS02: Flammable) (GHS05: Corrosive) (GHS06: Toxic) (GHS07: Exclamation mark)
Signal word	Danger
Hazard statements	H225, H301, H302, H314, H317
Precautionary statements	P210, P233, P240, P241, P242, P243, P260, P264, P264+P265, P270, P272, P280, P301+P316, P301+P317, P301+P330+P331, P302+P352, P302+P361+P354, P303+P361+P353, P304+P340, P305+P354+P338, P316, P317, P321, P330, P333+P317, P362+P364, P363, P370+P378, P403+P235, P405, P501
- Lethal dose or concentration (LD, LC)
LD_{50} (median dose)	75 mg/kg (mouse, intraperitoneal)
Safety data sheet (SDS)	Fischer Scientific
- Except where otherwise noted, data are given for materials in their standard state (at 25 °C [77 °F], 100 kPa). verify (what is ?) Infobox references

Thioacetic acid is an organosulfur compound with the molecular formula CH_{3}C(O)SH. It is a thioic acid: the sulfur analogue of acetic acid (CH_{3}C(O)OH), as implied by the thio- prefix. It is a yellow liquid with a strong thiol-like odor. It is used in organic synthesis for the introduction of thiol groups (−SH) in molecules.

== Synthesis and properties ==
Thioacetic acid is prepared by the reaction of acetic anhydride with hydrogen sulfide:

(CH_{3}C(O))_{2}O + H_{2}S → CH_{3}C(O)SH + CH_{3}C(O)OH

It has also been produced by the action of phosphorus pentasulfide on glacial acetic acid, followed by distillation.

CH_{3}C(O)OH + P_{2}S_{5} → CH_{3}C(O)SH + P_{2}OS_{4}

Thioacetic acid is typically contaminated by acetic acid.

The compound exists exclusively as the thiol tautomer, consistent with the strength of the C=O double bond. Reflecting the influence of hydrogen-bonding, the boiling point (93 °C) and melting points are 20 and 75 K lower than those for acetic acid.

== Reactivity ==
=== Acidity ===
With a pK_{a} near 3.4, thioacetic acid is about 15 times more acidic than acetic acid. The conjugate base is thioacetate:

CH_{3}C(O)SH → CH_{3}C(O)S^{−} + H^{+}

In neutral water, thioacetic acid is fully ionized.

=== Reactivity of thioacetate ===
Most of the reactivity of thioacetic acid arises from the conjugate base, thioacetate. Salts of this anion, e.g. potassium thioacetate, are used to generate thioacetate esters. Thioacetate esters undergo hydrolysis to give thiols. A typical method for preparing a thiol from an alkyl halide using thioacetic acid proceeds in four discrete steps, some of which can be conducted sequentially in the same flask:

CH_{3}C(O)SH + NaOH → CH_{3}C(O)SNa + H_{2}O
CH_{3}C(O)SNa + RX → CH_{3}C(O)SR + NaX, where X = Cl, Br, I
CH_{3}C(O)SR + 2 NaOH → CH_{3}CO_{2}Na + RSNa + H_{2}O
RSNa + HCl → RSH + NaCl

In an application that illustrates the use of its radical behavior, thioacetic acid is used with AIBN in a free radical mediated nucleophilic addition to an exocyclic alkene forming a thioester:

thioacetic acid application

==== Reductive acetylation ====
Potassium thioacetate can be used convert nitroarenes to aryl acetamides in one step. This is particularly useful in the preparation of pharmaceuticals, e.g., paracetamol from 4-nitrophenol or 4-nitroanisole.
