= 2,6-Pyridinedicarbothioic acid =

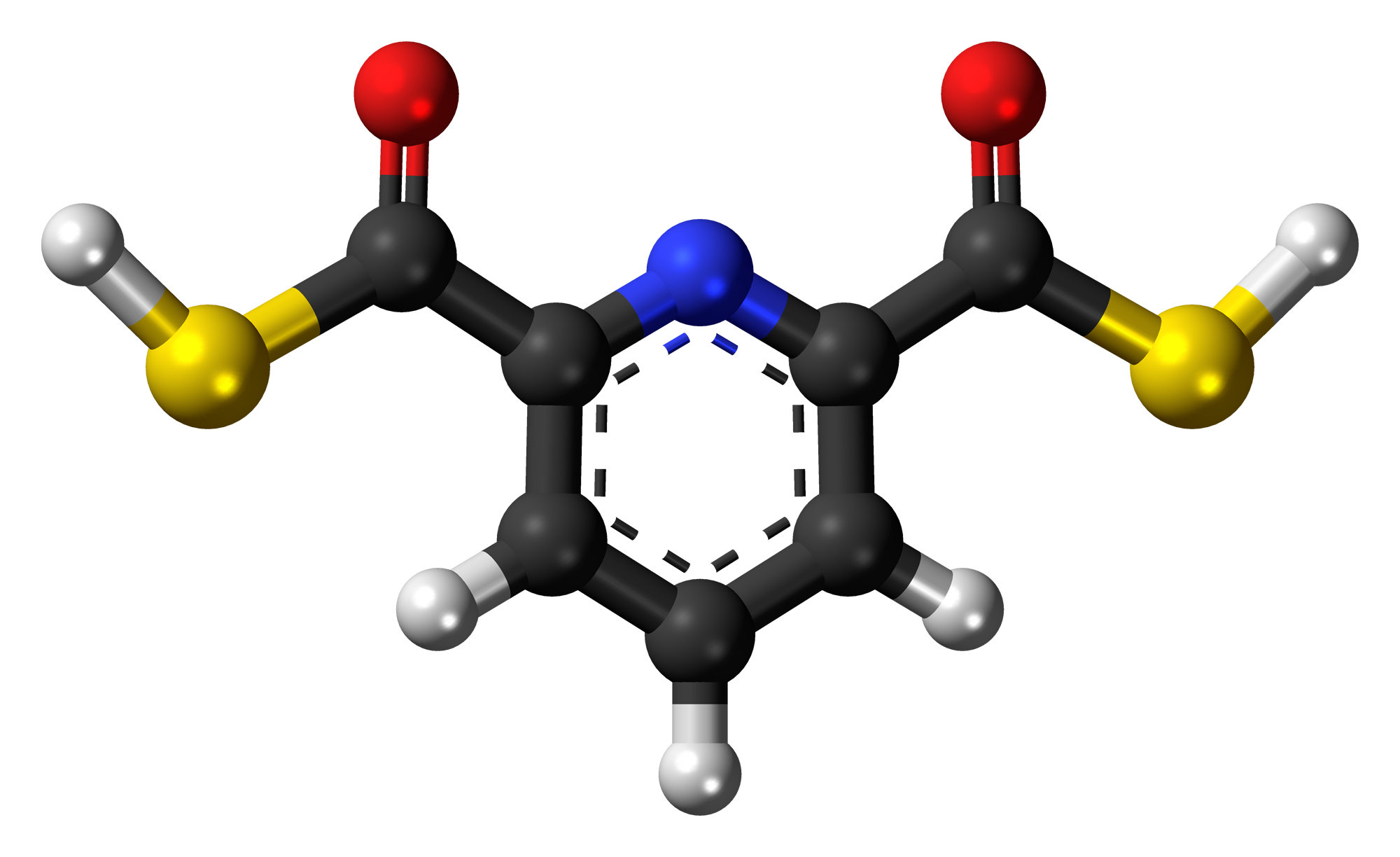

Names
- Preferred IUPAC name Pyridine-2,6-dicarbothioic acid
- Other names PDTC, dithiopyridinedicarbothioic acid

Identifiers
CAS Number	69945-42-2
3D model (JSmol)	Interactive image; Interactive image
ChemSpider	8389947
PubChem CID	10214455
UNII	KJ7K75Z4JS
CompTox Dashboard (EPA)	DTXSID90436773
- InChI: InChI=1S/C7H5NO2S2/c9-6(11)4-2-1-3-5(8-4)7(10)12/h1-3H,(H,9,11)(H,10,12) Key: SSRIAMRLMUFTNV-UHFFFAOYSA-N
- SMILES: C1=CC(=NC(=C1)C(=O)S)C(=O)S; O=C(S)c1nc(C(=O)S)ccc1

Properties
Chemical formula	C_{7}H_{5}O_{2}S_{2}
Molar mass	185.24 g·mol^{−1}
Appearance	White crystalline solid
Density	1.415 g/cm^{3}
Melting point	97 to 99 °C (207 to 210 °F; 370 to 372 K)
Boiling point	404.4 °C (759.9 °F; 677.5 K)
Solubility in water	1000 g/L (5.02 mol/L)

Hazards
- Occupational safety and health (OHS/OSH)
Main hazards	acidic
Flash point	198.4 °C (389.1 °F; 471.5 K)
- Except where otherwise noted, data are given for materials in their standard state (at 25 °C [77 °F], 100 kPa). verify (what is ?) Infobox references

2,6-Pyridinedicarbothioic acid (PDTC) is an organosulfur compound that is produced by some bacteria. It functions as a siderophore, a low molecular weight compound that scavenges iron. Siderophores solubilize compounds by forming strong complexes. PDTC is secreted by the soil bacteria Pseudomonas stutzeri and Pseudomonas putida.

== Synthesis and biosynthesis ==
PDTC can be synthesized in the laboratory by treating the diacid dichloride of pyridine-2,6-dicarboxylic with H_{2}S in pyridine:

NC_{5}H_{3}(COCl)_{2} + 2 H_{2}S + 2 C_{5}H_{5}N → [C_{5}H_{5}NH^{+}][HNC_{5}H_{3}(COS)^{−}_{2}] + [C_{5}H_{5}NH]Cl

This route produces the pyridinium salt of pyridinium-2,6-dicarbothioate. Treatment of this orange-colored salt with sulfuric acid gives colorless PDTC, which can then be extracted with dichloromethane.

The biosynthesis of PDTC remains unclear although some insights can be deduced from the genetics. It is suggested that Pseudomonas stutzeri may have acquired at least one of the genes by lateral transfer from mycobacteria. In a proposed biosynthetic sequence pyridine-2,6-dicarboxylic acid, a known bacterial metabolite, is activated as its bis-adenosine monophosphate (AMP) derivative. The sulfur donor and its activation remain uncertain.

== Coordination chemistry ==
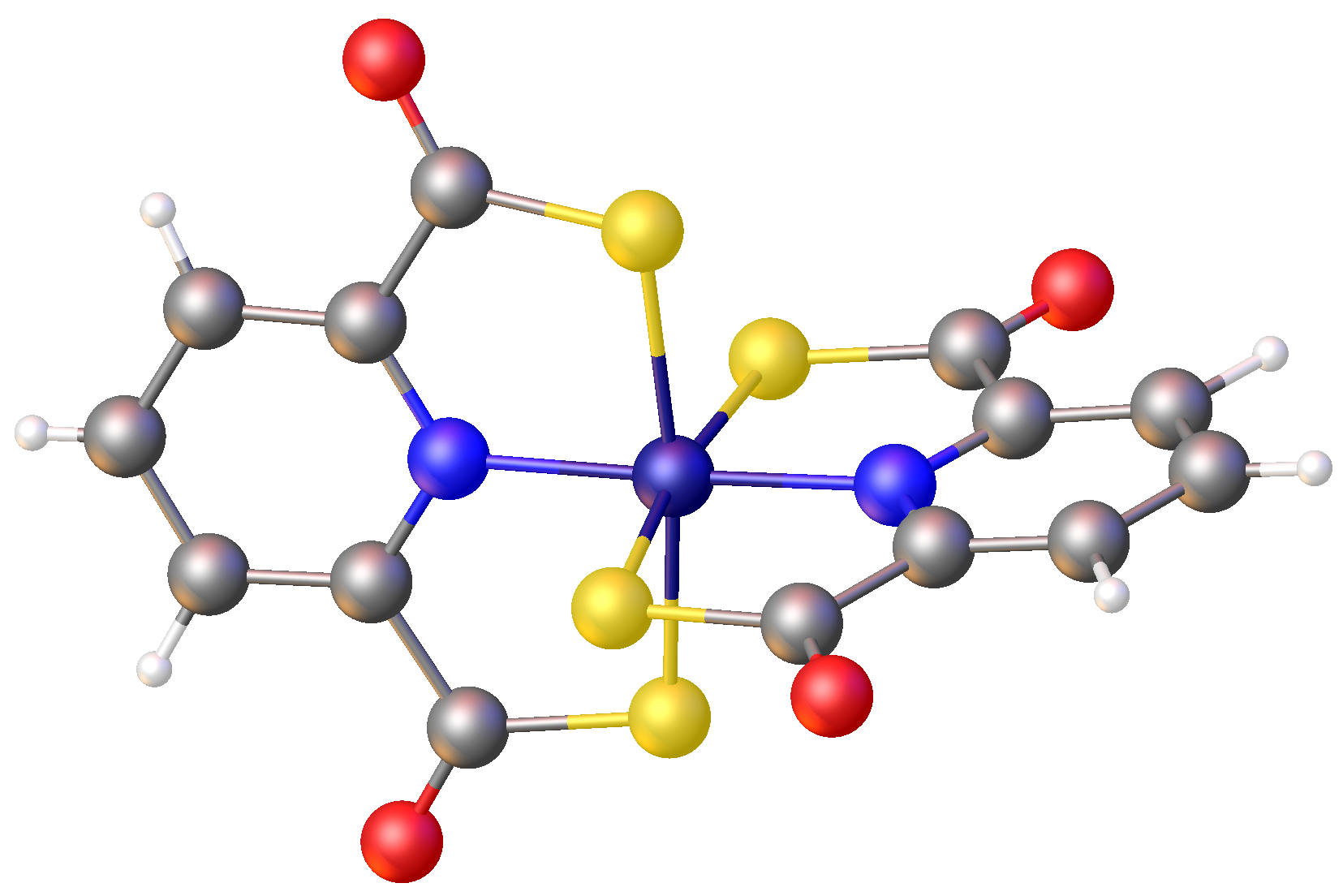
Structure of Fe(III) complex with two 2,6-pyridinedicarbothioate ligands. Color code: yellow = S, blue = N and Fe, gray = C, red = O.

PDTC binds to both Fe^{2+} and Fe^{3+}. The ferric complex is brown, whereas the ferrous complex is blue. In the presence of air, the ferrous complex oxidizes to the ferric compound. It is iron selective as only the Fe complex is soluble in water. PDTC is produced mainly during the exponential phase of bacterial growth. The conditions at which Pseudomonas produces PDTC is 25 °C, pH=8 and sufficient aeration.

== See also ==
- Dipicolinic acid
