= Dithiobenzoic acid =

Names
- Preferred IUPAC name Benzenecarbodithioic acid

Identifiers
CAS Number	121-68-6
3D model (JSmol)	Interactive image
ChemSpider	60487
ECHA InfoCard	100.004.084
EC Number	204-491-4
PubChem CID	67141
UNII	U9MSY3N8YB
CompTox Dashboard (EPA)	DTXSID0059532
- InChI: InChI=1S/C7H6S2/c8-7(9)6-4-2-1-3-5-6/h1-5H,(H,8,9) Key: ZGRWZUDBZZBJQB-UHFFFAOYSA-N
- SMILES: C1=CC=C(C=C1)C(=S)S

Properties
Chemical formula	C_{7}H_{6}S_{2}
Molar mass	154.25 g·mol^{−1}
Appearance	dark red sticky solid or viscous oil
Acidity (pK_{a})	1.92
- Except where otherwise noted, data are given for materials in their standard state (at 25 °C [77 °F], 100 kPa). Infobox references

Dithiobenzoic acid is the organosulfur compound with the formula C_{6}H_{5}CS_{2}H. It is a dithiocarboxylic acid, an analogue of benzoic acid, but more acidic and deeply colored.

== Synthesis and reactions ==
It can be prepared by sulfiding benzotrichloride:

C_{6}H_{5}CCl_{3} + 4 KSH → C_{6}H_{5}CS_{2}K + 3 KCl + 2 H_{2}S
C_{6}H_{5}CS_{2}K + H^{+} → C_{6}H_{5}CS_{2}H + K^{+}

It also arises by the reaction of the Grignard reagent phenylmagnesium bromide with carbon disulfide, followed by acidification:

C_{6}H_{5}MgBr + CS_{2} → C_{6}H_{5}CS_{2}MgBr
C_{6}H_{5}CS_{2}MgBr + HCl → C_{6}H_{5}CS_{2}H + MgBrCl

It is about 100x more acidic than benzoic acid. Its conjugate base, dithiobenzoate, undergoes S-alkylation to give dithiocarboxylate esters. Similarly, dithiobenzoate reacts with "soft" metal salts to give complexes, e.g. Fe(S_{2}CC_{6}H_{5})_{3} and Ni(S_{2}CC_{6}H_{5})_{2}.

Chlorination of dithiobenzoic acid gives the thioacyl chloride C_{6}H_{5}C(S)Cl.

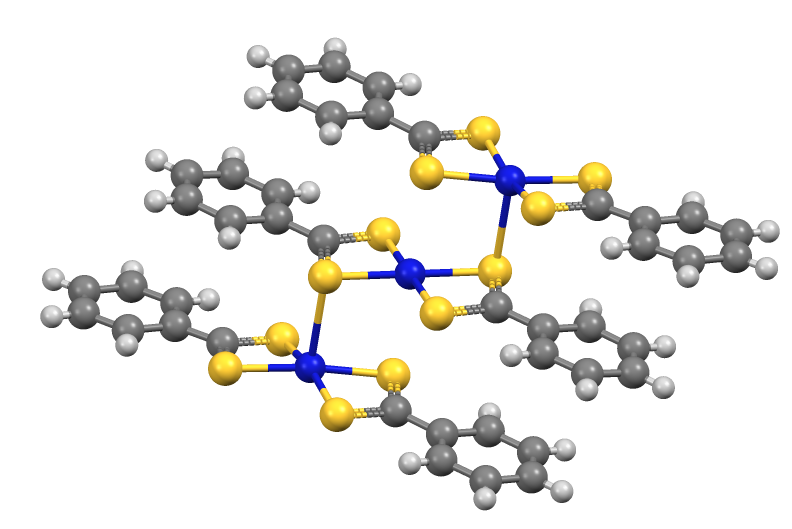
Structure of the trimer [Ni(S_{2}CPh)_{2}]_{3}.
