= Potassium hydrosulfide =

- K^{+}SH^{−}

Names
- IUPAC name Potassium hydrosulfide
- Other names Potassium bisulfide, Potassium sulfhydrate, potassium hydrogen sulfide

Identifiers
| CAS Number | 1310-61-8 |
| 3D model (JSmol) | Interactive image |
| ChemSpider | 92246 |
| ECHA InfoCard | 100.013.803 |
| EC Number | 215-182-9 |
| PubChem CID | 102109 |
| UNII | SX1L03AL9I |
| CompTox Dashboard (EPA) | DTXSID6061654 |
- InChI: InChI=1S/K.H2S/h;1H2/q+1;/p-1 Key: ZOCLAPYLSUCOGI-UHFFFAOYSA-M; InChI=1/K.H2S/h;1H2/q+1;/p-1 Key: ZOCLAPYLSUCOGI-REWHXWOFAJ
- SMILES: [SH-].[K+]

Properties
| Chemical formula | KSH |
| Molar mass | 72.171 g/mol |
| Appearance | white solid |
| Density | 1.68–1.70 g/cm^{3} |
| Melting point | 455 °C (851 °F; 728 K) |
| Solubility in water | good |

Hazards
- Occupational safety and health (OHS/OSH)
| Main hazards | Flammable solid, stench, releases hydrogen sulfide |
| NFPA 704 (fire diamond) | 3 2 0 |

Related compounds
| Other anions | Potassium hydroxide |
| Other cations | Sodium hydrosulfide |
| Related compounds | potassium sulfide |
- Except where otherwise noted, data are given for materials in their standard state (at 25 °C [77 °F], 100 kPa). verify (what is ?) Infobox references

Potassium hydrosulfide is an inorganic compound with the formula KSH. This colourless salt consists of the cation K^{+} and the bisulfide anion [SH]^{−}. It is the product of the half-neutralization of hydrogen sulfide with potassium hydroxide. The compound has been used in the synthesis of organosulfur compounds. Aqueous solutions of potassium sulfide consist of a mixture of potassium hydrosulfide and potassium hydroxide.

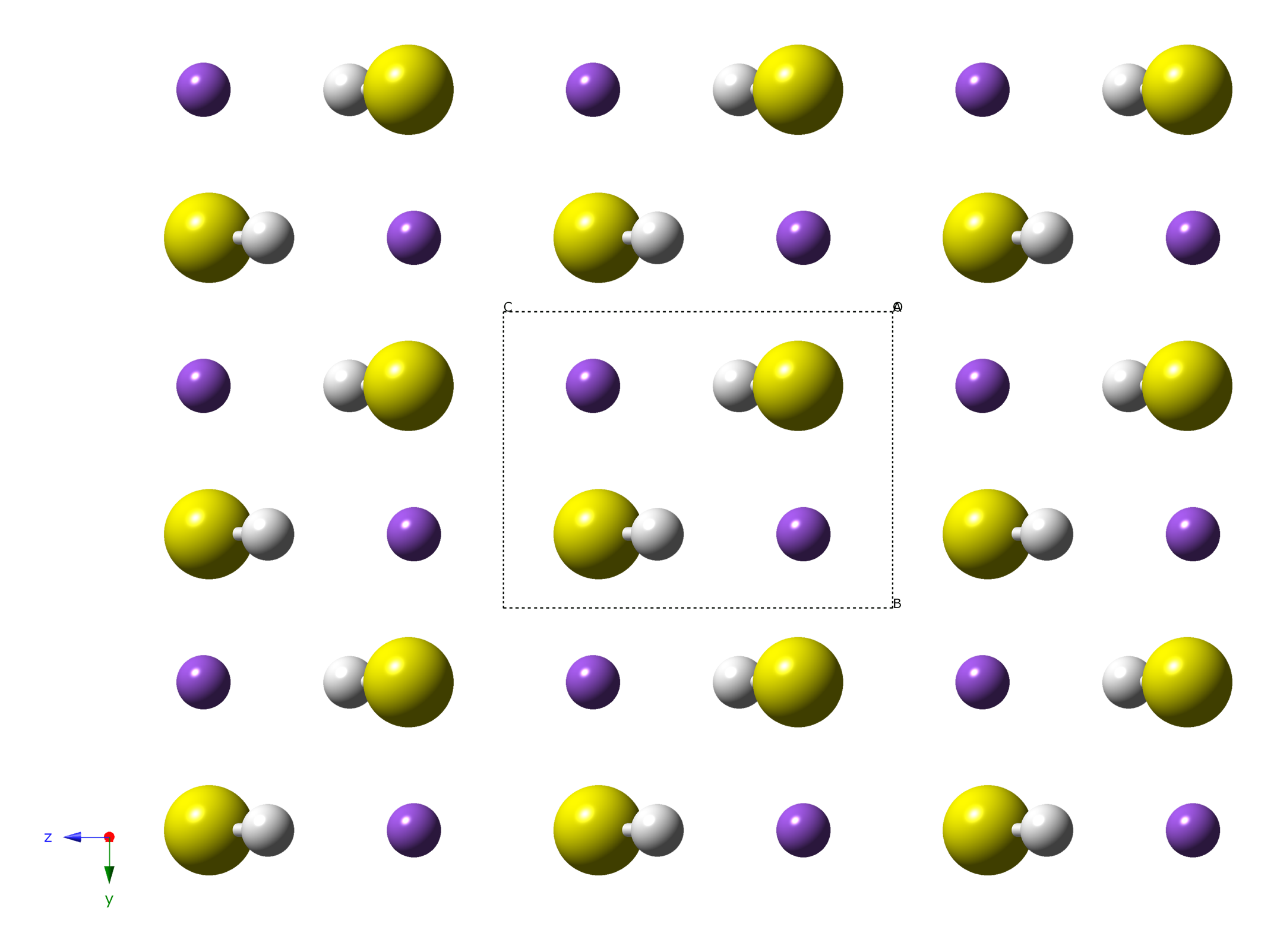
Atomic structure of crystalline KSH according to X-ray crystallography. Color code: violet = K, yellow = S, white = H.

The structure of the potassium hydrosulfide resembles that of potassium chloride. Their structure is however complicated by the non-spherical symmetry of the SH^{−} anions, but these tumble rapidly in the solid.

Potassium hydrosulfide reacts with elemental sulfur to gives polysulfide salts, such as dipotassium pentasulfide.

== Synthesis ==
Potassium hydrosulfide is prepared by neutralizing aqueous KOH with H_{2}S.
