= Thioester =

Organosulfur compounds of the form R–SC(=O)–R′

General structure of a thioester, where R and R' are organyl groups, or H in the case of R.

In organic chemistry, thioesters are organosulfur compounds with the molecular structure R−C(=O)−S−R'. They are analogous to carboxylate esters (R−C(=O)−O−R') with the sulfur in the thioester replacing oxygen in the carboxylate ester, as implied by the thio- prefix. They are the product of esterification of a carboxylic acid (R−C(=O)−O−H) with a thiol (R'−S−H). In biochemistry, the best-known thioesters are derivatives of coenzyme A, e.g., acetyl-CoA. The R and R' represent organyl groups, or H in the case of R.

== Synthesis ==
One route to thioesters involves the reaction of an acid chloride with an alkali metal salt of a thiol:

RSNa + R'COCl → R'COSR + NaCl

Another common route entails the displacement of halides by the alkali metal salt of a thiocarboxylic acid. (The analogous alkylation of a carboxylate salt is rarely practiced.) For example, thioacetate esters are commonly prepared by alkylation of potassium thioacetate:

CH_{3}COSK + RX → CH_{3}COSR + KX

The alkylation can be conducted using Mannich bases and the thiocarboxylic acid:

CH_{3}COSH + R'_{2}NCH_{2}OH → CH_{3}COSCH_{2}NR'_{2} + H_{2}O

Thioesters can be prepared by condensation of thiols and carboxylic acids in the presence of dehydrating agents:

RSH + R'CO_{2}H → RSC(O)R' + H_{2}O

A typical dehydration agent is DCC. Efforts to improve the sustainability of thioester synthesis have also been reported utilising safer coupling reagent T3P and greener solvent cyclopentanone. Acid anhydrides and some lactones also give thioesters upon treatment with thiols in the presence of a base.

Thioesters can be conveniently prepared from alcohols by the Mitsunobu reaction, using thioacetic acid.

They also arise via carbonylation of alkynes and alkenes in the presence of thiols.

== Reactions ==
Thioesters hydrolyze to thiols and the carboxylic acid:

RC(O)SR' + H_{2}O → RCO_{2}H + RSH

The carbonyl center in thioesters is more reactive toward amine than oxygen nucleophiles, giving amides:

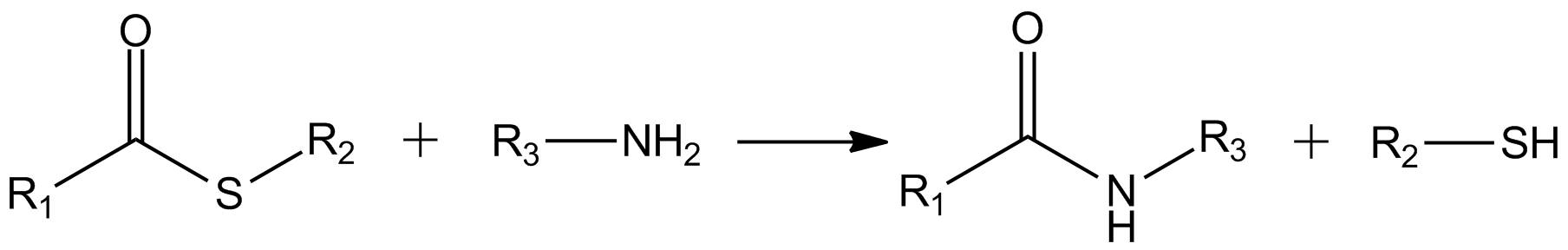

Thioesters are components of the native chemical ligation method for peptide synthesis.

This reaction is exploited in native chemical ligation, a protocol for peptide synthesis.

In a related reaction, thioesters can be converted into esters. Thioacetate esters can also be cleaved with methanethiol in the presence of stoichiometric base, as illustrated in the preparation of pent-4-yne-1-thiol:

H_{3}C(CH_{2})_{3}OMs + KSAc → H_{3}C(CH_{2})_{3}SAc + KOMs
H_{3}C(CH_{2})_{3}SAc + HSMe → H_{3}C(CH_{2})_{3}SH + MeSAc

Thioesters enolize easily as the sulfur atom stabilizes the enol. But the enols are less nucleophilic than ketene acetals, and carbonyl α-substitution reactions occur more slowly.

A reaction unique to thioesters is the Fukuyama coupling, in which the thioester is coupled with an organozinc halide by a palladium catalyst to give a ketone.

== Biochemistry ==
Structure of acetyl coenzyme A, a thioester that is a key intermediate in the biosynthesis of many biomolecules.

Thioesters are common intermediates in many biosynthetic reactions, including the formation and degradation of fatty acids and mevalonate, precursor to steroids. Examples include malonyl-CoA, acetoacetyl-CoA, propionyl-CoA, cinnamoyl-CoA, and acyl carrier protein (ACP) thioesters. Acetogenesis proceeds via the formation of acetyl-CoA. The biosynthesis of lignin, which comprises a large fraction of the Earth's land biomass, proceeds via a thioester derivative of caffeic acid. These thioesters arise analogously to those prepared synthetically, the difference being that the dehydration agent is ATP. In addition, thioesters play an important role in the tagging of proteins with ubiquitin, which tags the protein for degradation.

Oxidation of the sulfur atom in thioesters (thiolactones) is postulated in the bioactivation of the antithrombotic prodrugs ticlopidine, clopidogrel, and prasugrel.

=== Thioesters and the origin of life ===
As posited in a "Thioester World", thioesters are possible precursors to life. As Christian de Duve explains:

It is revealing that thioesters are obligatory intermediates in several key processes in which ATP is either used or regenerated. Thioesters are involved in the synthesis of all esters, including those found in complex lipids. They also participate in the synthesis of a number of other cellular components, including peptides, fatty acids, sterols, terpenes, porphyrins, and others. In addition, thioesters are formed as key intermediates in several particularly ancient processes that result in the assembly of ATP. In both these instances, the thioester is closer than ATP to the process that uses or yields energy. In other words, thioesters could have actually played the role of ATP in a "thioester world" initially devoid of ATP. Eventually, [these] thioesters could have served to usher in ATP through its ability to support the formation of bonds between phosphate groups.

However, due to the high free energy change of thioester's hydrolysis and correspondingly their low equilibrium constants, it is unlikely that these compounds could have accumulated abiotically to any significant extent especially in hydrothermal vent conditions.

== Thionoesters ==
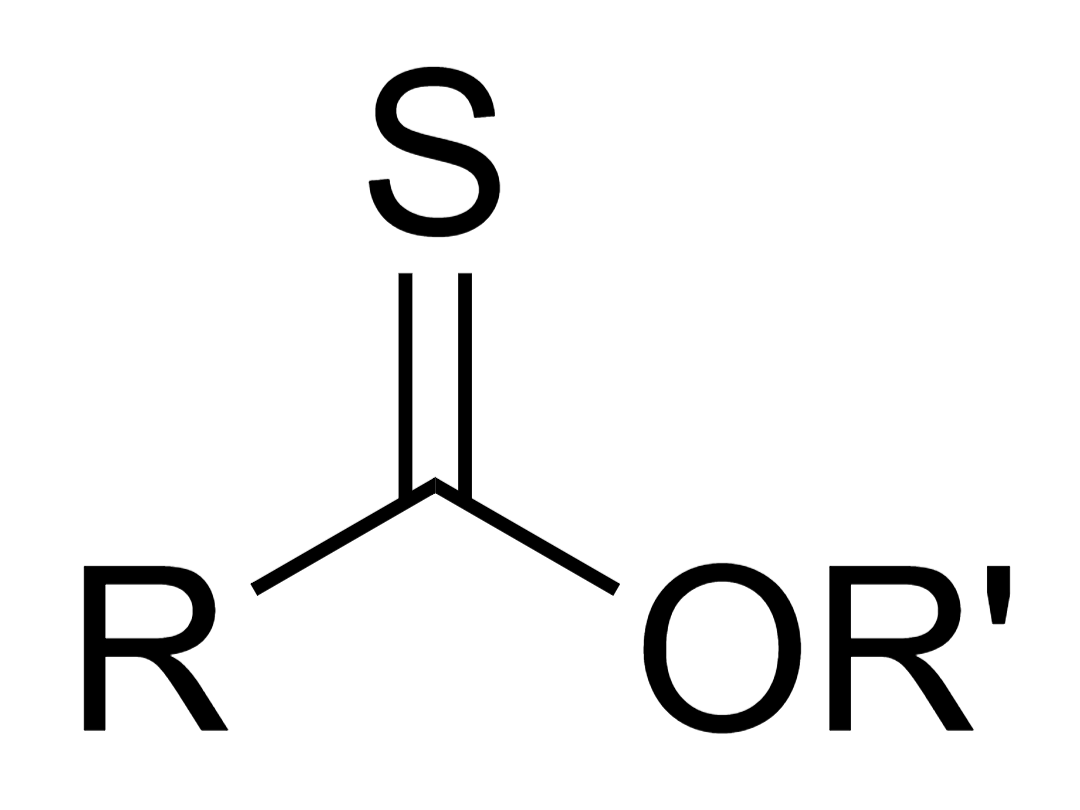
General structure of a thionoester, where R and R' are organyl groups, or H in the case of R

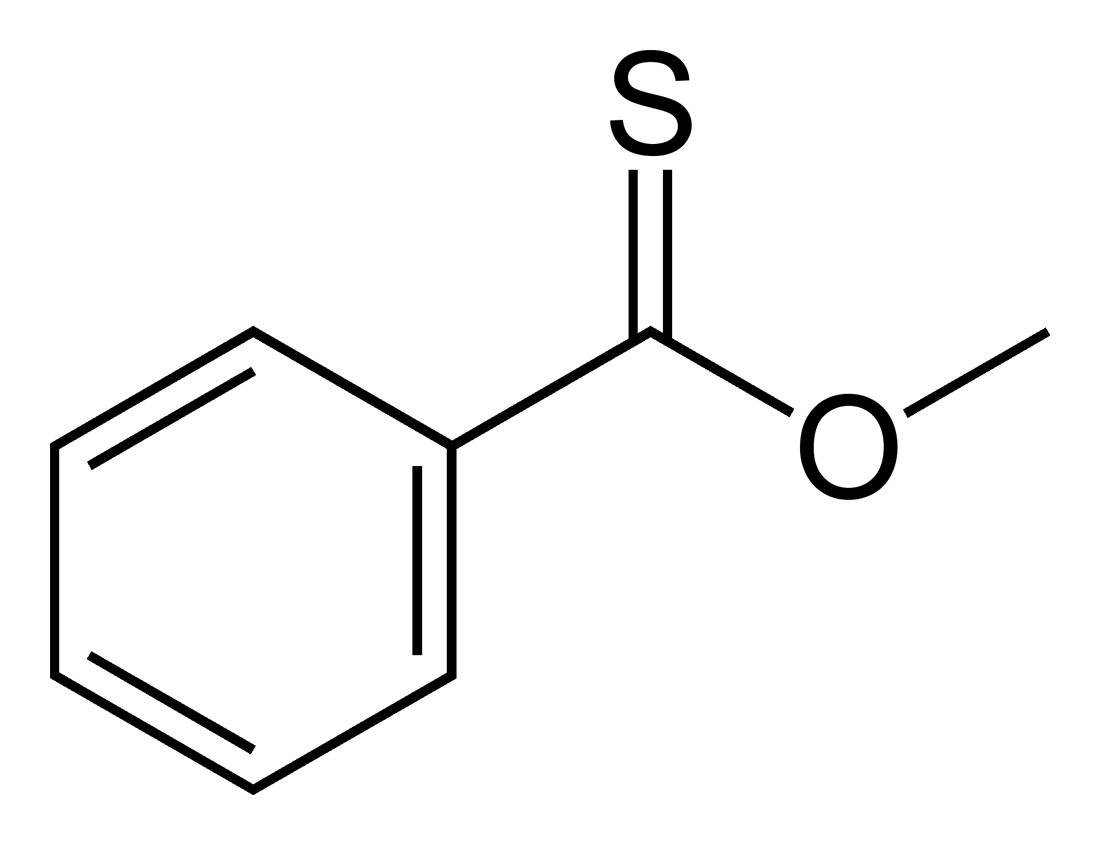
Skeletal formula of methyl thionobenzoate

Thionoesters are isomeric with thioesters. In a thionoester, sulfur replaces the carbonyl oxygen in an ester. Methyl thionobenzoate is C_{6}H_{5}C(S)OCH_{3}. Such compounds are typically prepared by the reaction of the thioacyl chloride with an alcohol.

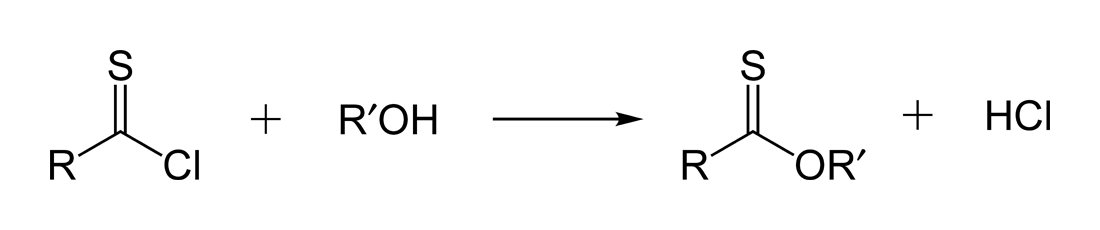

They can also be made by the reaction of Lawesson's reagent with esters or by treating pinner salts with hydrogen sulfide.

Various thionoesters may be prepared through the transesterification of an existing methyl thionoester with an alcohol under base-catalyzed conditions.

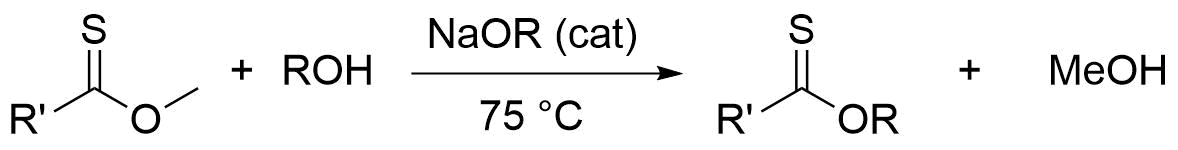

Xanthates and thioamides can be transformed to thionoesters under metal-catalyzed cross-coupling conditions.

== See also ==
- Thiocarboxylic acid
- Thiocarbonate
- Liebeskind–Srogl coupling
- Aldrithiol-2
