= Merox =

Acronym for mercaptan oxidation

Merox is an acronym for mercaptan oxidation. It is a proprietary catalytic chemical process developed by UOP used in oil refineries and natural gas processing plants to remove mercaptans from LPG, propane, butanes, light naphthas, kerosene, and jet fuel by converting them to liquid hydrocarbon disulfides.

The Merox process requires an alkaline environment which, in some process versions, is provided by an aqueous solution of sodium hydroxide (NaOH), a strong base, commonly referred to as caustic. In other versions of the process, the alkalinity is provided by ammonia, which is a weak base.

The catalyst in some versions of the process is a water-soluble liquid. In other versions, the catalyst is impregnated into charcoal granules.

Processes within oil refineries or natural gas processing plants that remove mercaptans and/or hydrogen sulfide (H_{2}S) are commonly referred to as sweetening processes because they result in products which no longer have the sour, foul odors of mercaptans and hydrogen sulfide. The liquid hydrocarbon disulfides may remain in the sweetened products. These may be used as part of the refinery or natural gas processing plant fuel, or they may be processed further.

When dealing with kerosene, the Merox process is usually more economical than using a catalytic hydrodesulfurization process for much the same purpose. It is rarely (if ever) required to reduce the sulphur content of a straight-run kerosene to meet the 3000 ppm sulphur specification of jet fuel, because very few crude oils have a kerosene cut with a higher content of sulphur than this limit.

== Types of Merox process units ==
UOP has developed many versions of the Merox process for various applications:

- Conventional Merox for extraction of mercaptans from LPG, propane, butanes or light naphthas.
- Conventional Merox for sweetening jet fuels and kerosenes.
- Merox for extraction of mercaptans from refinery and natural gases.
- Minalk Merox for sweetening of naphthas. This process continuously injects just a few ppm of caustic into the feed naphtha.
- Caustic-free Merox for sweetening jet fuels and kerosenes. This process injects small amounts of ammonia and water (rather than caustic) into the feed naphtha to provide the required alkalinity.
- Caustic-free Merox for sweetening of naphthas. This process also injects small amounts of ammonia and water (rather than caustic) into the feed naphtha to provide the required alkalinity.

In all of the above Merox versions, the overall oxidation reaction that takes place in converting mercaptans to disulfides is:

4 RSH + O_{2} → 2RSSR + 2H_{2}O

The most common mercaptans removed are:

- Methanethiol - CH_{3}SH [m-mercaptan]
- Ethanethiol - C_{2}H_{5}SH [e- mercaptan]
- 1-Propanethiol - C_{3}H_{7}SH [n-P mercaptan]
- 2-Propanethiol - CH_{3}CH(SH)CH_{3} [2C3 mercaptan]
- Butanethiol - C_{4}H_{9}SH [n-butyl mercaptan]
- tert-Butyl mercaptan - C(CH_{3})_{3}SH [t-butyl mercaptan]
- Pentanethiol - C_{5}H_{11}SH [pentyl mercaptan]

In some of the above Merox process versions, the catalyst is a liquid. In others, the catalyst is in the form of impregnated charcoal granules.

Process flow diagrams and descriptions of the two conventional versions of the Merox process are presented in the following sections.

== Conventional Merox for extracting mercaptans from LPG ==
The conventional Merox process for extraction and removal of mercaptans from liquefied petroleum gases (LPG), such as propane, butanes and, mixtures of propane and butanes, can also be used to extract and remove mercaptans from light naphthas. It is a two-step process. In the first step, the feedstock LPG or light naphtha is contacted in the trayed extractor vessel with an aqueous caustic solution containing UOP's proprietary liquid catalyst. The caustic solution reacts with mercaptans and extracts them. The reaction that takes place in the extractor is:

2RSH + 2 NaOH → 2NaSR + 2 H_{2}O

In the above reaction, RSH is a mercaptan and R signifies an organic group such as a methyl, ethyl, propyl or other groups. For example, the ethyl mercaptan (ethanethiol) has the formula C_{2}H_{5}SH.

The second step is referred to as regeneration and it involves heating and oxidizing of the caustic solution leaving the extractor. The oxidations results in converting the extracted mercaptans to organic disulfides (RSSR) which are liquids that are water-insoluble and are then separated and decanted from the aqueous caustic solution. The reaction that takes place in the regeneration step is:

4NaSR + O_{2} + 2H_{2}O → 2RSSR + 4NaOH

After decantation of the disulfides, the regenerated "lean" caustic solution is recirculated back to the top of the extractor to continue extracting mercaptans.

The net overall Merox reaction covering the extraction and the regeneration step may be expressed as:

4 RSH + O_{2} → 2RSSR + 2H_{2}O

The feedstock entering the extractor must be free of any H_{2}S. Otherwise, any H_{2}S entering the extractor would react with the circulating caustic solution and interfere with the Merox reactions. Therefore, the feedstock is first "prewashed" by flowing through a batch of aqueous caustic to remove any H_{2}S. The reaction that takes place in the prewash vessel is:

H_{2}S + NaOH → NaSH + H_{2}O

The batch of caustic solution in the prewash vessel is periodically discarded as "spent caustic" and replaced by fresh caustic as needed.

=== Flow diagram ===
The flow diagram below depicts the equipment and the flow paths involved in the process. The LPG (or light naphtha) feedstock enters the prewash vessel and flows upward through a batch of caustic which removes any H_{2}S that may be present in the feedstock. The coalescer at the top of the prewash vessel prevents caustic from being entrained and carried out of the vessel.

The feedstock then enters the mercaptan extractor and flows upward through the contact trays where the LPG intimately contacts the downflowing Merox caustic that extracts the mercaptans from the LPG. The sweetened LPG exits the tower and flows through: a caustic settler vessel to remove any entrained caustic, a water wash vessel to further remove any residual entrained caustic and a vessel containing a bed of rock salt to remove any entrained water. The dry sweetened LPG exits the Merox unit.

The caustic solution leaving the bottom of the mercaptan extractor ("rich" Merox caustic) flows through a control valve which maintains the extractor pressure needed to keep the LPG liquified. It is then injected with UOP's proprietary liquid catalyst (on an as needed basis), flows through a steam-heated heat exchanger and is injected with compressed air before entering the oxidizer vessel where the extracted mercaptans are converted to disulfides. The oxidizer vessel has a packed bed to keep the aqueous caustic and the water-insoluble disulfide well contacted and well mixed.

The caustic-disulfide mixture then flows into the separator vessel where it is allowed to form a lower layer of "lean" Merox caustic and an upper layer of disulfides. The vertical section of the separator is for the disengagement and venting of excess air and includes a Raschig ring section to prevent entrainment of any disulfides in the vented air. The disulfides are withdrawn from the separator and routed to fuel storage or to a hydrotreater unit. The regenerated lean Merox caustic is then pumped back to the top of the extractor for reuse.

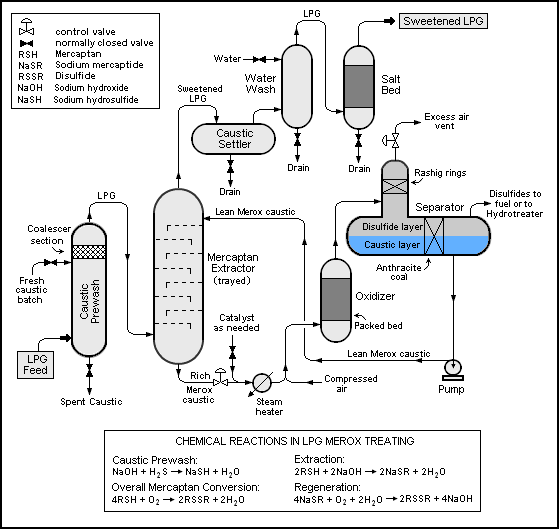
Flow diagram of a conventional Merox process unit for extracting mercaptans from liquified petroleum gas (LPG).

== Conventional Merox for sweetening jet fuel or kerosene ==
The conventional Merox process for the removal of mercaptans (i.e., sweetening) of jet fuel or kerosene is a one-step process. The mercaptan oxidation reaction takes place in an alkaline environment as the feedstock jet fuel or kerosene, mixed with compressed air, flows through a fixed bed of catalyst in a reactor vessel. The catalyst consists of charcoal granules that have been impregnated with UOP's proprietary catalyst. The oxidation reaction that takes place is:

4 RSH + O_{2} → 2 RSSR + 2H_{2}O

As is the case with the conventional Merox process for treating LPG, the jet fuel or kerosene sweetening process also requires that the feedstock be prewashed to remove any H_{2}S that would interfere with the sweetening. The reaction that takes place in the batch caustic prewash vessel is:

H_{2}S + NaOH → NaSH + H_{2}O

=== Flow diagram ===
The Merox reactor is a vertical vessel containing a bed of charcoal granules that have been impregnated with the UOP catalyst. The charcoal granules may be impregnated with the catalyst in situ or they may be purchased from UOP as pre-impregnated with the catalyst. An alkaline environment is provided by caustic being pumped into reactor on an intermittent, as needed basis.

The jet fuel or kerosene feedstock from the top of the caustic prewash vessel is injected with compressed air and enters the top of the Merox reactor vessel along with any injected caustic. The mercaptan oxidation reaction takes place as the feedstock percolates downward over the catalyst. The reactor effluent flows through a caustic settler vessel where it forms a bottom layer of aqueous caustic solution and an upper layer of water-insoluble sweetened product.

The caustic solution remains in the caustic settler so that the vessel contains a reservoir for the supply of caustic that is intermittently pumped into the reactor to maintain the alkaline environment.

The sweetened product from the caustic settler vessel flows through a water wash vessel to remove any entrained caustic as well as any other unwanted water-soluble substances, followed by flowing through a salt bed vessel to remove any entrained water and finally through a clay filter vessel. The clay filter removes any oil-soluble substances, non-metallic compounds (especially copper) and particulate matter, which might prevent meeting jet fuel product specifications.

The pressure maintained in the reactor is injected air will completely dissolve in the feedstock at the operating temperature.

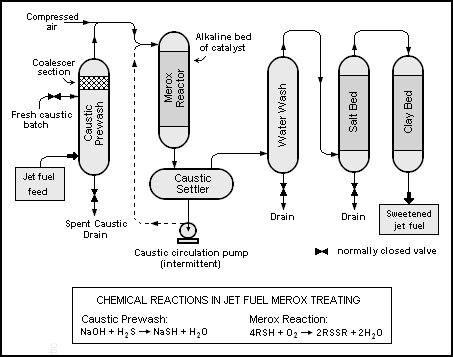
Conventional Merox process unit for sweetening jet fuel or kerosene

== See also ==
- 2006 Côte d'Ivoire toxic waste spill
