= C3H8S =

The molecular formula C_{3}H_{8}S (molar mass: 76.16 g/mol, exact mass: 76.0347 u) may refer to:

- Propanethiol
  - 1-Propanethiol
  - 2-Propanethiol
- Ethyl methyl sulfide
