= C4H10S =

The molecular formula C_{4}H_{10}S may refer to:

- Butanethiol (n-butyl mercaptan), a volatile, clear to yellowish liquid with a fetid odor
- tert-Butylthiol (t-butyl mercaptan), an organosulfur thiol is used as an odorant for natural gas
- Diethyl sulfide, an organosulfur thioether colorless, malodorous liquid
