= Butylthiol =

Butylthiol may refer to:

- Butanethiol (1-butylthiol)
- tert-Butylthiol (TBM)
