= C2H6S =

The molecular formula C_{2}H_{6}S (molar mass: 62.13 g/mol, exact mass: 62.0190 u) may refer to:

- Dimethyl sulfide (DMS), or methylthiomethane
- Ethanethiol, or ethyl mercaptan
