= Sodium ethanethiolate =

Names
- Other names: Sodium thioethoxide; Sodium ethyl mercaptide; Sodium ethylmercaptide

Identifiers
CAS Number	811-51-8
3D model (JSmol)	Interactive image
ChemSpider	3658468
EC Number	684-910-9
PubChem CID	4459711
CompTox Dashboard (EPA)	DTXSID001001774
- InChI: InChI=1S/C2H6S.Na/c1-2-3;/h3H,2H2,1H3;/q;+1/p-1 Key: QJDUDPQVDAASMV-UHFFFAOYSA-M
- SMILES: CC[S-].[Na+]

Properties
Chemical formula	C_{2}H_{5}NaS
Molar mass	84.11 g·mol^{−1}
Appearance	white solid
- Except where otherwise noted, data are given for materials in their standard state (at 25 °C [77 °F], 100 kPa). Infobox references

Sodium ethanethiolate is an organosulfur compound with the formula CH_{3}CH_{2}SNa. It is the sodium salt of the conjugate base of ethanethiol. This compound is commercially available as a white solid that is soluble in polar organic solvents. Sodium ethanethiolate is a reagent in organic synthesis. Hydrolysis of sodium ethanethiolate, e.g. in humid air, produces ethanethiol, which has a low odor threshold and a noxious "rotten egg" smell.

== Preparation ==
Sodium ethanethiolate can be produced by treating a solution of ethanethiol with sodium hydride:

CH_{3}CH_{2}SH + NaH → CH_{3}CH_{2}SNa + H_{2}

The closely related sodium methanethiolate can be prepared and used in situ (i.e., without isolation) by treatment of a solution of methanethiol with strong base such as sodium hydroxide.

== Reactions ==
Sodium ethanethiolate is a source of ethanethiolate, a powerful nucleophile. It is used to cleave methoxy-aryl ethers:

NaSCH_{2}CH_{3} + Ar−O−CH_{3} → Ar−ONa + CH_{3}CH_{2}SCH_{3} (Ar = aryl)

It converts alkyl halides to ethyl thioethers

NaSCH_{2}CH_{3} + RX → RSCH_{2}CH_{3} + NaX (X = halogen, R = alkyl)

Oxidation of sodium methanethiolate gives diethyldisulfide:

2 NaSCH_{2}CH_{3} + I_{2} → CH_{3}CH_{2}SSCH_{2}CH_{3} + 2 NaI
