= Propane (data page) =

Chemical data page

This page provides supplementary chemical data on propane.

== Structure and properties ==
Structure and properties
| Dielectric constant | (fluid) 1.6 ε_{0} at 0 °C |
| Magnetic susceptibility | −40 |

== Thermodynamic properties ==
Phase behavior
| Triple point | 85.47 K (−187.68 °C), 0.000169 Pa |
| Critical point | 369.522 K (96.672 °C), 42.4924 bar |
| Std enthalpy change of fusion, Δ_{fus}H^{~~o~~} | 79.96 J/g |
| Std entropy change of fusion, Δ_{fus}S^{~~o~~} | ? J/(mol·K) |
| Std enthalpy change of vaporization, Δ_{vap}H^{~~o~~} | 24.545 kJ/mol |
| Std entropy change of vaporization, Δ_{vap}S^{~~o~~} | ? J/(mol·K) |
Solid properties
| Std enthalpy change of formation, Δ_{f}H^{~~o~~}_{solid} | −103.85 kJ/mol |
| Standard molar entropy, S^{~~o~~}_{solid} | ? J/(mol K) |
| Heat capacity, c_{p} | ? J/(mol K) |
Liquid properties
| Std enthalpy change of formation, Δ_{f}H^{~~o~~}_{liquid} | −118.910 kJ/mol |
| Standard molar entropy, S^{~~o~~}_{liquid} | 171.0 J/(mol K) |
| Heat capacity, c_{p} | 98.36 J/(mol K) |
Gas properties
| Std enthalpy change of formation, Δ_{f}H^{~~o~~}_{gas} | −104.7 kJ/mol |
| Standard molar entropy, S^{~~o~~}_{gas} | 269.91 J/(mol K) |
| Enthalpy of combustion, Δ_{c}H^{~~o~~} | −2220.0 kJ/mol |
| Heat capacity, c_{p} | 73.60 J/(mol K) |
| van der Waals' constants | a = 877.88 L^{2} kPa/mol^{2} b = 0.08445 liter per mole |

== Density of liquid and gas ==
Propane is highly temperature dependent. The density of liquid and gaseous propane are given on the next image.

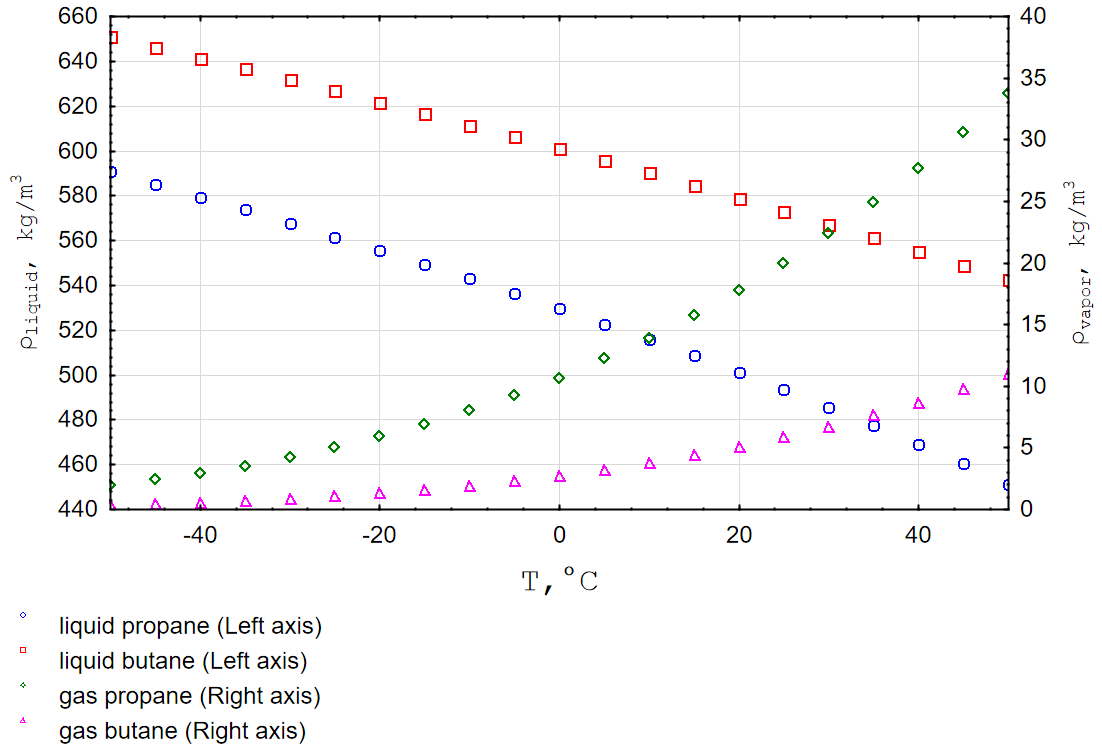

== Vapor pressure of liquid ==
| P in mm Hg | 1 | 10 | 40 | 100 | 400 | 760 | 1520 | 3800 | 7600 | 15200 | 30400 | 45600 |
| T in °C | −128.9 | −108.5 | −92.4 | −79.6 | −55.6 | −42.1 | −25.6 | 1.4 | 25.6 | 58.1 | 94.8 | — |

Table data obtained from CRC Handbook of Chemistry and Physics 44th ed.

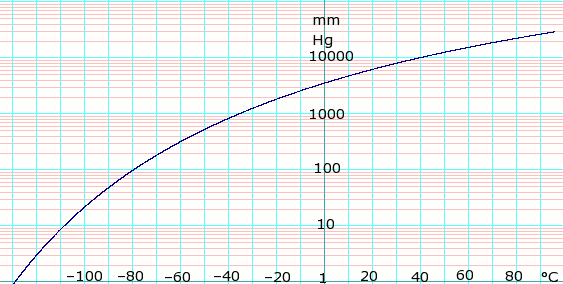
log of propane vapor pressure. Uses formula: $\scriptstyle \log_{10} P_{mmHg}=6.82973 - \frac {813.20} {248.00+T}$ from Lange's Handbook of Chemistry, 10th ed.

== Spectral data ==
UV-Vis
| λ_{max} | ? nm |
| Extinction coefficient, ε | ? |
IR
| Major absorption bands | ? cm^{−1} |
NMR
| Proton NMR |
| Carbon-13 NMR |
| Other NMR data |
MS
| Masses of main fragments |

== Material Safety Data Sheet ==
Propane does not have health effects other than the danger of frostbite or asphyxiation. The National Propane Gas Association has a generic MSDS available online here. (Issued 1996)

- MSDS from Suburban Propane, L.P dated 5/2013 in the SDSdata.org database
This box:
- Except where noted otherwise, data relate to Standard temperature and pressure.
- Reliability of data general note.
