= Spent caustic =

Waste industrial caustic solution

Spent caustic is a waste industrial caustic solution that has become exhausted and is no longer useful (or spent). Spent caustics are made of sodium hydroxide or potassium hydroxide, water, and contaminants. The contaminants have consumed the majority of the sodium (or potassium) hydroxide and thus the caustic liquor is spent, for example, in one common application H_{2}S (gas) is scrubbed by the NaOH (aqueous) to form NaHS (aq) and H_{2}O (l), thus consuming the caustic.

== Types ==
- Ethylene spent caustic comes from the caustic scrubbing of cracked gas from an ethylene cracker. This liquor is produced by a caustic scrubbing tower. Ethylene product gas is contaminated with H_{2}S(g) and CO_{2}(g), and those contaminants are removed by absorption in the caustic scrubbing tower to produce NaHS(aq) and Na_{2}CO_{3}(aq). The sodium hydroxide is consumed and the resulting wastewater (ethylene spent caustic) is contaminated with the sulfides and carbonates and a small fraction of organic compounds.
- Refinery spent caustic comes from multiple sources: the Merox processing of gasoline; the Merox processing of kerosene/jet fuel; and the caustic scrubbing/Merox processing of LPG. In these streams sulfides and organic acids are removed from the product streams into the caustic phase. The sodium hydroxide is consumed and the resulting wastewaters (cresylic for gasoline; naphthenic for kerosene/jet fuel; sulfidic for LPG -spent caustics) are often mixed and called refinery spent caustic. This spent caustic is contaminated with sulfides, carbonates, and in many cases a high fraction of organic acids.

== Treatment technologies ==
Spent caustics are malodorous wastewaters that are difficult to treat in conventional wastewater processes. Typically the material is disposed of by high dilution with biotreatment, deep well injection, incineration, wet air oxidation, Humid Peroxide Oxidation or other speciality processes. Most ethylene spent caustics are disposed of through wet air oxidation.
