= Odorizer =

Device that adds an odorant to a gas

An odorizer is a device that adds an odorant to a gas. The most common type is one that adds a mercaptan liquid into natural gas distribution systems so that leaks can be readily detected.Other types have been used for carbon dioxide fire extinguishers.

== Natural gas odorizers ==
Natural gas odorizers can vary from a simple wick in a container to computerized equipment, which controls the amount of odorant based on flow rate, tracks the amount of odorant in inventory, and alarms when odorant is not being injected into the gas stream.

Odorants used for natural gas vary from country to country, depending on gas distribution regulations. Some odorants contain sulfur, which is oxidized to sulfur dioxide when the gas is burned.

Sulfur-containing odorants include the following:

- tert-Butylthiol (TBM) the main ingredient in many gas odorant blends
- Tetrahydrothiophene (THT), used as an odorant for natural gas, usually in mixtures containing tert-butylthiol
- 2-Propanethiol, commonly known as isopropyl mercaptan (IPM) is used as an odorant for natural gas usually in mixtures containing tert-butylthiol
- Ethanethiol (EM), commonly known as ethyl mercaptan is used in liquefied petroleum gas (LPG) and resembles odor of leeks, onions, durian, or cooked cabbage
- Methanethiol, commonly known as methyl mercaptan, is added to natural gas as an odorant, usually in mixtures containing methane. Its smell is reminiscent of rotten eggs or cabbage.
- Dimethyl sulfide (DMS), a component of the smell produced from cooking of certain vegetables, notably maize, cabbage, beetroot, and seafoods

Non-sulfur-containing odorants include the following:

- Methyl acrylate (MA)
- Ethyl acrylate (EA)
- Methylethyl pyrazine, the odor of various foods including coffee and wines.

== Wick type odorizers ==
Wick type odorizers can be very small, odorizing the gas for as few as one gas customer to much larger ones that can odorize the gas for a small town (10,000 MCF). They use a wick which is very similar to those used in a kerosene lantern. The odorant is drawn up the wick from the container and into the gas stream. The efficiency of these odorizers can be influenced by factors such as gas flow rates and temperature, which affect the rate of odorant vaporization. Regular maintenance is essential to prevent contamination of the wick and ensure consistent odorization.

== Absorption bypass odorizers ==
Absorption bypass odorizers take a portion of the gas stream, the amount being dependent on the flow of gas in the line, and run it through a tank containing liquid odorant. The gas is passed over the top of the liquid. Variations exist where wicks are utilized to increase odorant vaporization.

== Liquid injection type odorizers ==
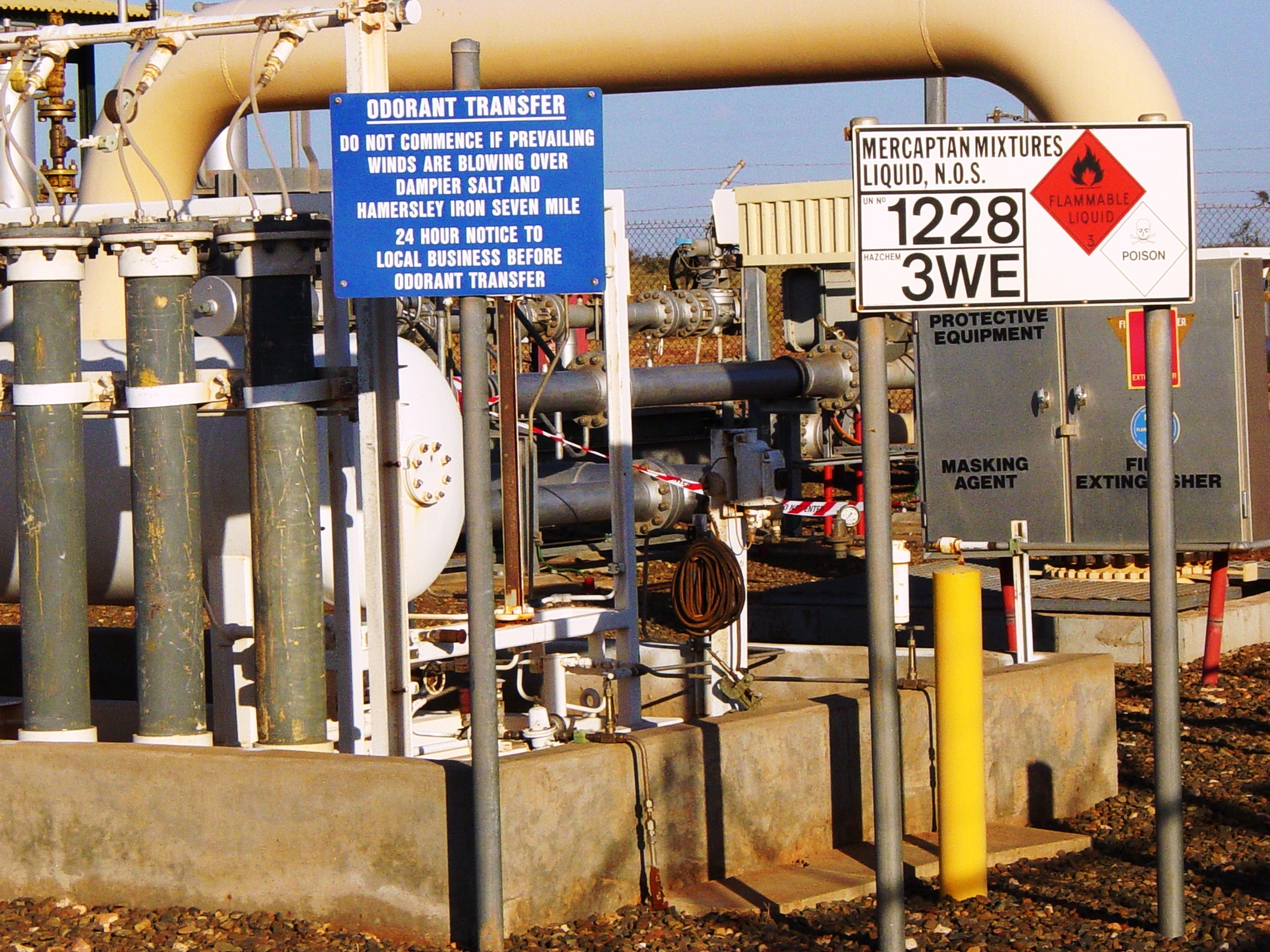
A pipeline odorant injection station

For very high volume systems (and for some smaller volume systems), liquid injection odorizers are being manufactured. These odorizers work by the addition of small amounts of liquid odorant to the moving gas. A pump that can be controlled to give the range of addition rates necessary is a very important aspect of this type of odorizer. Computer control to monitor flow rates and vary injection rate is a significant part of the more modern versions of this. Previous versions worked off a variety of schemes to control the odorization level.

The Peerless odorizer was the first example of this type of odorizer. The Peerless natural-gas odorizer was recognized as a Mechanical Engineering Landmark by the American Society of Mechanical Engineers in 1992. This odorizer was said to have been developed in response to the New London School explosion that occurred in March 1937. It was first shipped in July 1937, the Peerless odorizer overcame two of the major problems of previous devices: they avoided problems with leaky shaft seals by encapsulating the entire unit within a pressure vessel and added odorant in proportion to the gas flow by using a gas meter to drive the odorant pump.

== Other odorizers ==
=== Carbon dioxide fire extinguishers ===
Odorizers are used in carbon dioxide fire extinguisher systems, the odorizer assembly injects wintergreen oil (methyl salicylate) into the carbon dioxide stream when the agent is discharged. Approximately 50 cc of wintergreen oil contained within a frangible glass cartridge is mounted within a protective housing attached to the discharge piping in such a manner as to rupture the glass container when the carbon dioxide manifold is pressurized during discharge, atomizing the oil and dispersing it. The strong wintergreen scent effectively notifies the occupants of the presence of carbon dioxide gas after carbon dioxide has been discharged into the hazard.

=== Mine gas warning systems ===
Similar systems are used in mines, where, in the case of an emergency such as a gas leak in the mine, ampoules of ethanethiol are broken in front of ventilation fans to warn the miners of the emergency.
