= Propanethiol =

There are two isomers of propanethiol.

- 1-Propanethiol, n-propanethiol, or propane-1-thiol: CH_{3}CH_{2}CH_{2}SH
- 2-Propanethiol, isopropanethiol, or propane-2-thiol: (CH_{3})_{2}CHSH or CH_{3}CHSHCH_{3}
