= Thiol =

Any organic compound having a sulfanyl group (–SH)

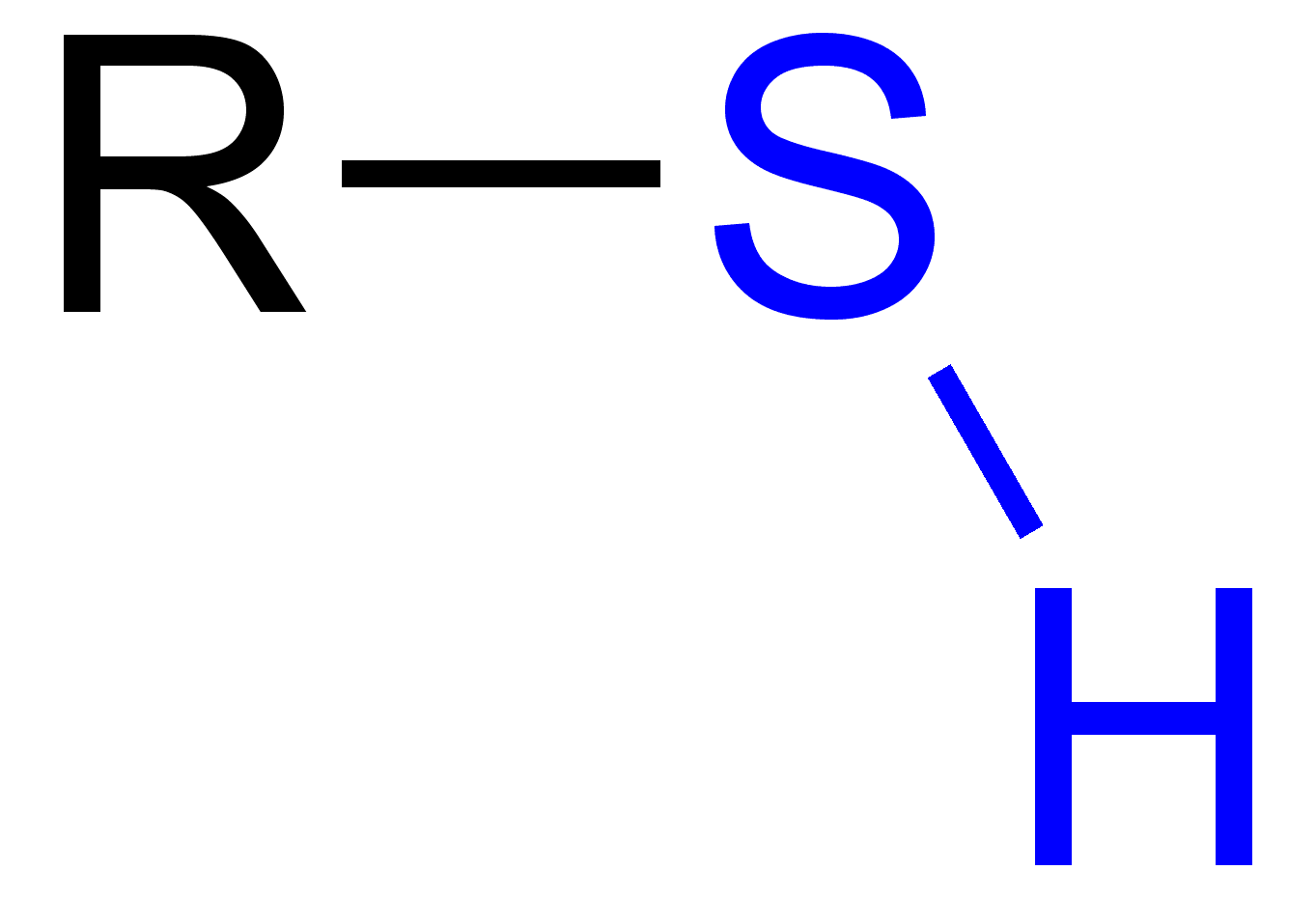
- Thiol with a blue highlighted sulfhydryl group R represents an alkyl or other organic substituent.

Names
Pronunciation	/ˈθaɪɒl/
- Other names: Mercaptans; Mercapto compounds
- Except where otherwise noted, data are given for materials in their standard state (at 25 °C [77 °F], 100 kPa). Infobox references

In organic chemistry, a thiol (/ˈθaɪɒl/; from Ancient Greek θεῖον (theion) 'sulfur') or thiol derivative is any organosulfur compound of the form R−SH, where R represents an alkyl or other organic substituent. The −SH functional group itself is referred to as either a thiol group or a sulfhydryl group, or a sulfanyl group. Thiols are the sulfur analogue of alcohols (that is, sulfur takes the place of oxygen in the hydroxyl (−OH) group of an alcohol), and the word is a blend of "thio-" with "alcohol".

Many thiols have strong odors resembling that of garlic, cabbage or rotten eggs. Thiols are used as odorants to assist in the detection of natural gas (which in pure form is odorless). The smell of natural gas is due to the addition of thiol.

== Nomenclature ==
Thiols are sometimes referred to as mercaptans (/mərˈkæptænz/) or mercapto compounds, a term introduced in 1832 by William Christopher Zeise and is derived from the Latin mercurio captāns ('capturing mercury') because the thiolate group (RS^{−}) bonds very strongly with mercury compounds.

There are several ways to name the alkylthiols:

- The suffix -thiol is added to the name of the alkane. This method is nearly identical to naming an alcohol and is used by the IUPAC, e.g. CH_{3}SH would be methanethiol.
- The word mercaptan replaces alcohol in the name of the equivalent alcohol compound. Example: CH_{3}SH would be methyl mercaptan, just as CH_{3}OH is called methyl alcohol.
- The term sulfhydryl- or mercapto- is used as a prefix, e.g. mercaptopurine.

== Physical properties ==
=== Odor ===
Many thiols have strong odors resembling that of garlic. The odors of thiols, particularly those of low molecular weight, are often strong and repulsive. The spray of skunks consists mainly of low-molecular-weight thiols and derivatives. These compounds are detectable by the human nose at concentrations of only 10 parts per billion. Human sweat contains (R)/(S)-3-methyl-3-sulfanylhexan-1-ol (3M3SH), detectable at 2 parts per billion and having an onion-like (S enantiomer) and fruity, grapefruit-like odor (R enantiomer). (Methylthio)methanethiol (MeSCH_{2}SH; MTMT) is a strong-smelling volatile thiol, also detectable at parts per billion levels, found in male mouse urine. Lawrence C. Katz and co-workers showed that MTMT functioned as a semiochemical, activating certain mouse olfactory sensory neurons, and attracting female mice. Copper has been shown to be required by a specific mouse olfactory receptor, MOR244-3, which is highly responsive to MTMT as well as to various other thiols and related compounds. A human olfactory receptor, OR2T11, has been identified which, in the presence of copper, is highly responsive to the gas odorants (see below) ethanethiol and t-butyl mercaptan as well as other low molecular weight thiols, including allyl mercaptan found in human garlic breath, and the strong-smelling cyclic sulfide thietane.

Thiols are also responsible for a class of wine faults caused by an unintended reaction between sulfur and yeast, as well as the "skunky" odor of beer that has been exposed to ultraviolet light.

Not all thiols have unpleasant odors. For example, furan-2-ylmethanethiol contributes to the aroma of roasted coffee, whereas grapefruit mercaptan, a monoterpenoid thiol, is responsible for the characteristic scent of grapefruit. The effect of the latter compound is present only at low concentrations. Concentrated samples have an unpleasant odor.

In the United States, distributors are required to add thiols, originally ethanethiol, to natural gas (which is naturally odorless) after the deadly New London School explosion in New London, Texas, in 1937, although many distributors were odorizing gas prior to this event. Most currently-used gas odorants contain mixtures of mercaptans and sulfides, with t-butyl mercaptan as the main odor constituent in natural gas and ethanethiol in liquefied petroleum gas (LPG, propane). In situations where thiols are used in commercial industry, such as liquid petroleum gas tankers and bulk handling systems, an oxidizing catalyst is used to destroy the odor. A copper-based oxidation catalyst neutralizes the volatile thiols and transforms them into inert products.

=== Boiling points and solubility ===
Thiols show little association by hydrogen bonding, both with water molecules and among themselves. Hence, they have lower boiling points and are less soluble in water and other polar solvents than alcohols of similar molecular weight. For this reason also, thiols and their corresponding sulfide functional group isomers have similar solubility characteristics and boiling points, whereas the same is not true of alcohols and their corresponding isomeric ethers.

== Structure and bonding ==
Thiols having the structure R−S−H, in which an alkyl group (R) is attached to a sulfhydryl group (SH), are referred to as alkanethiols or alkyl thiols. Thiols and alcohols have similar connectivity. Because sulfur atoms are larger than oxygen atoms, C−S bond lengths—typically around 180 picometres—are about 40 picometers longer than typical C−O bonds. C−S−H angles approach 90°, whereas the angle for the C−O−H group is more obtuse. In solids and liquids, the hydrogen-bonding between individual thiol groups is weak, and thus thiols are more volatile than the corresponding alcohols. The main cohesive forces for thiols involves Van der Waals interactions between the highly polarizable divalent sulfur centers.

The S−H bond is much weaker than the O−H bond as reflected in their respective bond dissociation energies (BDE). For CH_{3}S−H, the BDE is 366 kJ/mol (87 kcal/mol), while for CH_{3}O−H, the BDE is 440 kJ/mol (110 kcal/mol). Hydrogen-atom abstraction from a thiol gives a thiyl radical with the formula RS^{•}, where R = alkyl or aryl.

== Characterization ==
Volatile thiols are easily and almost unerringly detected by their distinctive odor. Sulfur-specific analyzers for gas chromatographs are useful. Spectroscopic indicators are the D_{2}O-exchangeable SH signal in the ^{1}H NMR spectrum (^{33}S is NMR-active but signals for divalent sulfur are very broad and of little utility). The ν_{SH} band appears near 2400 cm^{−1} in the IR spectrum. In the nitroprusside reaction, free thiol groups react with sodium nitroprusside and ammonium hydroxide to give a red colour.

== Preparation ==
In industry, methanethiol is prepared by the reaction of hydrogen sulfide with methanol. This method is employed for the industrial synthesis of methanethiol:

CH_{3}OH + H_{2}S → CH_{3}SH + H_{2}O

Such reactions are conducted in the presence of acidic catalysts. The other principal route to thiols involves the addition of hydrogen sulfide to alkenes. Such reactions are usually conducted in the presence of an acid catalyst or UV light. Halide displacement, using the suitable organic halide and sodium hydrogen sulfide has also been used.

Another method entails the alkylation of sodium hydrosulfide.

RX + NaSH → RSH + NaX (X = Cl, Br, I)

This method is used for the production of thioglycolic acid from chloroacetic acid.

=== Laboratory methods ===
In general, on the typical laboratory scale, the direct reaction of a haloalkane with sodium hydrosulfide is inefficient owing to the competing formation of sulfides (overalkylation). Instead, alkyl halides are converted to thiols via an S-alkylation of thiourea. This multistep, one-pot process proceeds via the intermediacy of the isothiouronium salt, which is hydrolyzed in a separate step:

CH_{3}CH_{2}Br + SC(NH_{2})_{2} → [CH_{3}CH_{2}SC(NH_{2})_{2}]Br
[CH_{3}CH_{2}SC(NH_{2})_{2}]Br + NaOH → CH_{3}CH_{2}SH + OC(NH_{2})_{2} + NaBr

The thiourea route works well with primary halides, especially activated ones. Secondary and tertiary thiols are less easily prepared. Secondary thiols can be prepared from the ketone via the corresponding dithioketals. A related two-step process involves alkylation of thiosulfate to give the thiosulfonate ("Bunte salt"), followed by hydrolysis. The method is illustrated by one synthesis of thioglycolic acid:

ClCH_{2}CO_{2}H + Na_{2}S_{2}O_{3} → Na[O_{3}S_{2}CH_{2}CO_{2}H] + NaCl

Na[O_{3}S_{2}CH_{2}CO_{2}H] + H_{2}O → HSCH_{2}CO_{2}H + NaHSO_{4}

Organolithium compounds and Grignard reagents react with sulfur to give the thiolates, which are readily hydrolyzed:

RLi + S → RSLi
RSLi + HCl → RSH + LiCl

Phenols can be converted to the thiophenols via rearrangement of their O-aryl dialkylthiocarbamates.

Thiols are prepared by reductive dealkylation of sulfides, especially benzyl derivatives and thioacetals.

Thiophenols are produced by S-arylation or the replacement of diazonium leaving group with sulfhydryl anion (SH^{−}):

ArN^{+}_{2} + SH^{−} → ArSH + N_{2}

== Classes of thiols ==
=== Alkyl and aryl thiols ===
Alkyl thiols are the simplest thiols. Methanethiol (CH_{3}SH, methyl mercaptan), ethanethiol (C_{2}H_{5}SH, ethyl mercaptan), propanethiol (C_{3}H_{7}SH), butanethiols (C_{4}H_{9}SH, n-butyl mercaptan and tert-Butyl mercaptan, are common reagents. While these thiols have the characteristic unpleasant odors, some thiols are responsible for the flavor and fragrance of foods, e.g. furan-2-ylmethanethiol. 1-Hexadecanethiol is a lipophilic alkylthiol.

Aryl thiols include the parent thiophenol (C_{6}H_{5}SH). Pentachlorobenzenethiol has pesticidal properties.

=== Dithiols ===
1,3-Propanedithiol and 1,2-ethanedithiol are reagents in organic chemistry. Dimercaptosuccinic acid is a chelating agent. Lipoic acid, a naturally occurring modification of 1,3-propanedithiol, is a cofactor for many enzymes. Dithiothreitol is a reagent in biochemistry.

=== Unsaturated thiols ===
Vinyl thiols are rare, but other unsaturated thiols are numerous. A textbook unsaturated thiol is grapefruit mercaptan, which exists as two enantiomers, each with distinct odors. The main component of skunk spray is a butenylthiol.

=== Thioalcohols ===
2-Mercaptoethanol is a reagent in biochemistry. 3-Mercaptopropane-1,2-diol is a medicine. These compounds have high solubility in water owing to the presence of OH substituent(s).

=== Thiol-carboxylic acids ===
Cysteine and penicillamine have the formula HSCR_{2}CH(NH_{2})CO_{2}H, where R = H and CH_{3}, respectively. Cysteine is common amino acid, and penicillamine has medicinal properties. Coenzyme A and glutathione are more complicated thiol-containing derivatives. Cysteine-rich proteins called metallothionein have high affinity for heavy metals. Thiocarboxylic acids, with the formula HS(O)CR, can be considered thiols also. Thioacetic acid is one example.

=== Aminothiols ===
Cysteine and penicillamine also are classified as an aminothiols. One variation is cysteamine (HSCH_{2}CH_{2}NH_{2}).

== Reactions ==
Thiols form sulfides, thioacetals, and thioesters, which are analogous to ethers, acetals, and esters, respectively.

=== Acidity ===
Thiols are easily deprotonated. Relative to the alcohols, thiols are more acidic. The conjugate base of a thiol is called a thiolate. Butanethiol has a pK_{a} of 10.5 vs 15 for butanol. Thiophenol has a pK_{a} of 6, versus 10 for phenol. A highly acidic thiol is pentafluorothiophenol (C_{6}F_{5}SH) with a pK_{a} of 2.68. Thus, thiolates can be obtained from thiols by treatment with alkali metal hydroxides.

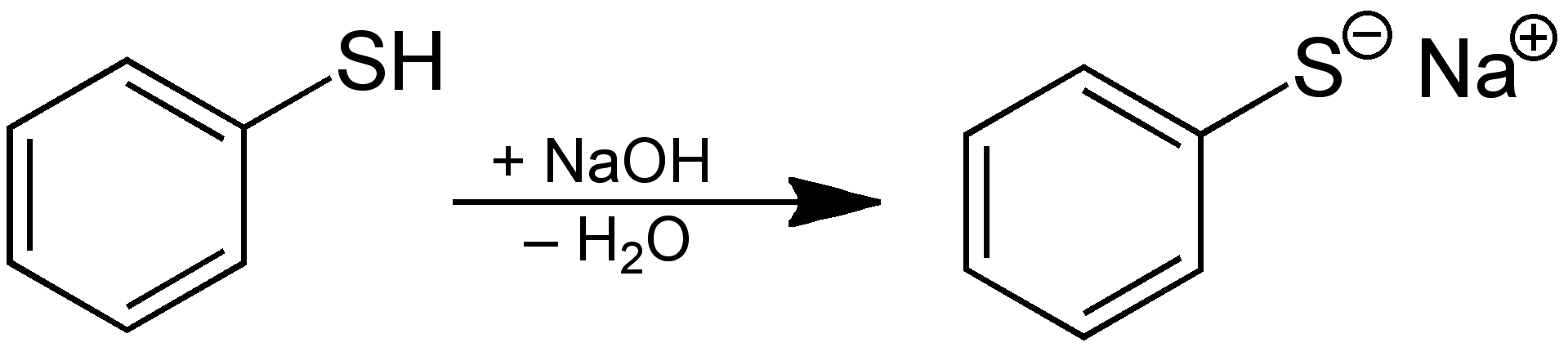
Synthesis of thiophenolate from thiophenol

=== S-Based nucleophilicity ===
The conjugate base of thiols are potent nucleophiles. They alkylate to give sulfides:

RSH + R′Br + B → RSR′ + [HB]Br (B = base)

Many electrophiles participate in this reaction. α,β-Unsaturated carbonyl compounds add thiols, especially in the presence of base catalysts. Thiolates react with carbon disulfide to give thioxanthate (RSCS^{−}_{2}).

=== Redox ===
Thiols, especially in the presence of base, are readily oxidized by reagents such as bromine and iodine to give an organic disulfide (R−S−S−R).

2 R−SH + Br_{2} → R−S−S−R + 2 HBr

Oxidation by more powerful reagents such as sodium hypochlorite or hydrogen peroxide can also yield sulfonic acids (RSO_{3}H).

R−SH + 3 H_{2}O_{2} → RSO_{3}H + 3 H_{2}O

Oxidation can also be effected by oxygen in the presence of catalysts:

2 R−SH + 1/_{2} O_{2} → RS−SR + H_{2}O

Thiols participate in thiol-disulfide exchange:

RS−SR + 2 R′SH → 2 RSH + R′S−SR′

This reaction is important in nature.

=== Metal ion complexation ===
With metal ions, thiolates behave as ligands to form transition metal thiolate complexes. The term mercaptan is derived from the Latin mercurium captans (capturing mercury) because the thiolate group bonds so strongly with mercury compounds. According to hard/soft acid/base (HSAB) theory, sulfur is a relatively soft (polarizable) atom. This explains the tendency of thiols to bind to soft elements and ions such as mercury, lead, or cadmium. The stability of metal thiolates parallels that of the corresponding sulfide minerals. Sodium aurothiolate is an antiarthritic drug.

== Thiyl radicals ==
Free radicals derived from mercaptans, called thiyl radicals, are commonly invoked to explain reactions in organic chemistry and biochemistry. They have the formula RS^{•} where R is an organic substituent such as alkyl or aryl. They arise from or can be generated by a number of routes, but the principal method is H-atom abstraction from thiols. Another method involves homolysis of organic disulfides. In biology thiyl radicals are responsible for the formation of the deoxyribonucleic acids, building blocks for DNA. This conversion is catalysed by ribonucleotide reductase (see figure). Thiyl intermediates also are produced by the oxidation of glutathione, an antioxidant in biology. Thiyl radicals (sulfur-centred) can transform to carbon-centred radicals via hydrogen atom exchange equilibria. The formation of carbon-centred radicals could lead to protein damage via the formation of C−C bonds or backbone fragmentation.

Because of the weakness of the S−H bond, thiols can function as scavengers of free radicals.

== Biological importance ==
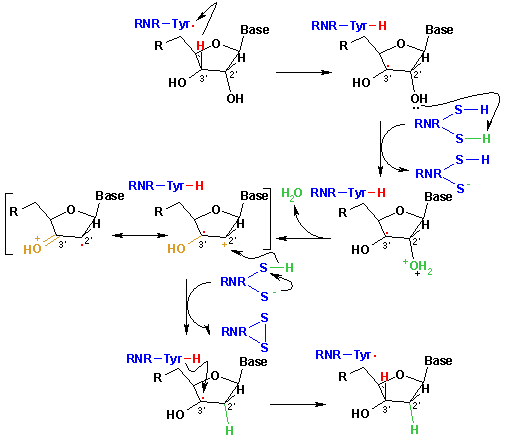
The catalytic cycle for ribonucleotide reductase, demonstrating the role of thiyl radicals in producing the genetic machinery of life.

=== Cysteine and cystine ===
As the functional group of the proteinogenic amino acid cysteine, the thiol group plays a very important role in biology. When the thiol groups of two cysteine residues (as in monomers or constituent units) are brought near each other in the course of protein folding, an oxidation reaction can generate a cystine unit with a disulfide bond (−S−S−). Disulfide bonds can contribute to a protein's tertiary structure if the cysteines are part of the same peptide chain, or contribute to the quaternary structure of multi-unit proteins by forming fairly strong covalent bonds between different peptide chains. A physical manifestation of cysteine-cystine equilibrium is provided by hair straightening technologies.

Sulfhydryl groups in the active site of an enzyme can form noncovalent bonds with the enzyme's substrate as well, contributing to covalent catalytic activity in catalytic triads. Active site cysteine residues are the functional unit in cysteine protease catalytic triads. Cysteine residues may also react with heavy metal ions (Zn^{2+}, Cd^{2+}, Pb^{2+}, Hg^{2+}, Ag^{+}) because of the high affinity between the soft sulfide and the soft metal (see hard and soft acids and bases). This can deform and inactivate the protein, and is one mechanism of heavy metal poisoning.

=== Cofactors ===
Many cofactors (non-protein-based helper molecules) feature thiols. The biosynthesis and degradation of fatty acids and related long-chain hydrocarbons is conducted on a scaffold that anchors the growing chain through a thioester derived from the thiol coenzyme A. Dihydrolipoic acid, a dithiol, is the reduced form of lipoic acid, a cofactor in several metabolic processes in mammals. Methane biosynthesis, the principal hydrocarbon on Earth, arises from the reaction mediated by coenzyme M (2-mercaptoethyl sulfonic acid) and coenzyme B (7-mercaptoheptanoylthreoninephosphate). Thiolates, the conjugate bases derived from thiols, form strong complexes with many metal ions, especially those classified as soft. The stability of metal thiolates parallels that of the corresponding sulfide minerals.

=== Drugs ===
Drugs containing thiol group:

- 6-Mercaptopurine (anticancer)
- Captopril (antihypertensive)
- D-penicillamine (antiarthritic)

== See also ==
- Doctor sweetening process
- Odorizer
- Persulfide
- Saville reaction
- Thiol-disulfide exchange
