= 1-Propanethiol =

Propanethiol

Names
- Preferred IUPAC name Propane-1-thiol
- Other names n-Propylthiol; 1-Propanethiol; Propan-1-thiol; Propyl mercaptan Mercaptan C3

Identifiers
CAS Number	107-03-9
3D model (JSmol)	Interactive image
ChEBI	CHEBI:8473
ChEMBL	ChEMBL1236818
ChemSpider	7560
ECHA InfoCard	100.003.142
EC Number	203-455-5
KEGG	C08390
PubChem CID	7848
UNII	4AB0N08V2H
UN number	2402
CompTox Dashboard (EPA)	DTXSID5026750
- InChI: InChI=1S/C3H8S/c1-2-3-4/h4H,2-3H2,1H3 Key: SUVIGLJNEAMWEG-UHFFFAOYSA-N
- SMILES: CCCS

Properties
Chemical formula	C_{3}H_{8}S
Molar mass	76.16 g·mol^{−1}
Appearance	Colorless to pale yellow liquid
Odor	cabbage-like
Density	0.84 g/mL
Melting point	−113 °C (−171 °F; 160 K)
Boiling point	67 to 68 °C (153 to 154 °F; 340 to 341 K)
Solubility in water	Slight
Vapor pressure	155 mmHg
Acidity (pK_{a})	~10.5
Magnetic susceptibility (χ)	−58.5·10^{−6} cm^{3}/mol

Hazards
- GHS labelling
Pictograms	(GHS02: Flammable) (GHS07: Exclamation mark)
Signal word	Danger
Hazard statements	H225, H302, H319
Precautionary statements	P210, P233, P240, P241, P242, P243, P264, P264+P265, P270, P280, P301+P317, P303+P361+P353, P305+P351+P338, P330, P337+P317, P370+P378, P403+P235, P501
Flash point	−21 °C; −5 °F; 253 K
- NIOSH (US health exposure limits)
PEL (Permissible)	none
REL (Recommended)	C 0.5 ppm (1.6 mg/m^{3}) [15-minute]
IDLH (Immediate danger)	N.D.
- Except where otherwise noted, data are given for materials in their standard state (at 25 °C [77 °F], 100 kPa). Infobox references

Propanethiol is an organic compound with the molecular formula C_{3}H_{8}S or CH_{3}CH_{2}CH_{2}SH. It belongs to the group of thiols. It is a colorless liquid with a strong, offensive odor. It is moderately toxic and is less dense than water and slightly soluble in water. It is used as a feedstock for insecticides. It is highly flammable and it gives off irritating or toxic fumes (or gases) in a fire. Heating it will cause rise in pressure with risk of bursting.

== Chemistry ==
Propanethiol is chemically classified among the thiols, which are organic compounds with molecular formulas and structural formulas similar to alcohols, except that sulfur-containing sulfhydryl group (-SH) replaces the oxygen-containing hydroxyl group in the molecule. Propanethiol's basic molecular formula is C_{3}H_{7}SH, and its structural formula is similar to that of the alcohol n-propanol.

Propanethiol is manufactured commercially by the reaction of propene with hydrogen sulfide with ultraviolet light initiation in an anti-Markovnikov addition. It can also be prepared by the reaction of sodium hydrosulfide with 1-chloropropane.

== See also ==
- Isopropyl mercaptan (2-propanethiol)
