= Markovnikov =

Markovnikov (Russian: Марковников) is a Russian masculine surname, which originates from морковь (carrot); its feminine counterpart is Markovnikova. It may refer to

- Vladimir Markovnikov (1837–1904), Russian chemist
- Nikolai Markovnikov (1869–1942), Russian architect and archaeologist, son of Vladimir

== See also ==
- Markovnikov's rule in chemistry, established by Vladimir Markovnikov
