= Allyl mercaptan =

Names
- Preferred IUPAC name Prop-2-ene-1-thiol
- Other names 2-Propene-1-thiol; Allyl thiol 3-Mercaptopropene

Identifiers
CAS Number	870-23-5
3D model (JSmol)	Interactive image
ChEBI	CHEBI:89888
ChEMBL	ChEMBL3222024
ChemSpider	13836713
ECHA InfoCard	100.011.630
EC Number	212-792-7212-792-7
PubChem CID	13367
UNII	1X587IBY09
CompTox Dashboard (EPA)	DTXSID2061226
- InChI: InChI=1S/C3H6S/c1-2-3-4/h2,4H,1,3H2 Key: ULIKDJVNUXNQHS-UHFFFAOYSA-N
- SMILES: C=CCS

Properties
Chemical formula	C_{3}H_{6}S
Molar mass	74.14 g·mol^{−1}

Hazards
- GHS labelling
Pictograms	(GHS02: Flammable) (GHS07: Exclamation mark)
Signal word	Danger
Hazard statements	H225, H302, H319, H332
Precautionary statements	P210, P233, P240, P241, P242, P243, P261, P264, P270, P271, P280, P301+P312, P303+P361+P353, P304+P312, P304+P340, P305+P351+P338, P312, P330, P337+P313, P370+P378, P403+P235, P501
- Except where otherwise noted, data are given for materials in their standard state (at 25 °C [77 °F], 100 kPa). Infobox references

Allyl mercaptan (AM) is a small molecule allyl derivative and an organosulfur compound derived from garlic and a few other genus Allium plants. Its formula is C_{3}H_{6}S. It has been shown to be the most effective HDAC inhibitor of known garlic-derived organosulfur compounds and their metabolites.
