= Isopropyl mercaptan =

Names
- Other names: 2-Propanethiol; Propane-2-thiol; 2-propanthiol; 2-propane thiol; Isopropyl mercaptan; Isopropanethiol; Isopropylthiol; 2-Mercaptopropane; 2-Propylmercaptan; 1-Methylethanethiol

Identifiers
CAS Number	75-33-2
3D model (JSmol)	Interactive image
Beilstein Reference	605260
ChEBI	CHEBI:8474
ChEMBL	ChEMBL1897156
ChemSpider	6124
ECHA InfoCard	100.000.784
EC Number	200-861-4
KEGG	C08391
PubChem CID	6364
UNII	E52LR62ETC
UN number	2402
CompTox Dashboard (EPA)	DTXSID1025481
- InChI: InChI=1S/C3H8S/c1-3(2)4/h3-4H,1-2H3 Key: KJRCEJOSASVSRA-UHFFFAOYSA-N
- SMILES: CC(C)S

Properties
Chemical formula	C_{3}H_{8}S
Molar mass	76.16 g·mol^{−1}
Density	0.8143
Melting point	−130.7 °C (−203.3 °F; 142.5 K)
Boiling point	52.5 °C (126.5 °F; 325.6 K)
Solubility in water	4835 g/L
Vapor pressure	277.3 mm Hg

Hazards
- GHS labelling
Pictograms	(GHS02: Flammable) (GHS06: Toxic) (GHS07: Exclamation mark)
Signal word	Danger
Hazard statements	H225, H302, H315, H319, H331
Precautionary statements	P210, P233, P240, P241, P242, P243, P261, P264, P264+P265, P270, P271, P280, P301+P317, P302+P352, P303+P361+P353, P304+P340, P305+P351+P338, P316, P321, P330, P332+P317, P337+P317, P362+P364, P370+P378, P403+P233, P403+P235, P405, P501

Related compounds
Related compounds	1-Propanethiol
- Except where otherwise noted, data are given for materials in their standard state (at 25 °C [77 °F], 100 kPa). Infobox references

Isopropyl mercaptan is a thiol with the formula C_{3}H_{8}S. It is a water-white liquid with an extremely pungent odor resembling skunk spray or rotten eggs. The pungent smell allows it to be used as an odorizer. The FDA has approved it for use as a food additive for its flavor. Another use is as a rubber additive.

== See also ==
- 1-Propanethiol
