= Ethanethiol =

Chemical compound

- Skeletal structure of ethanethiol

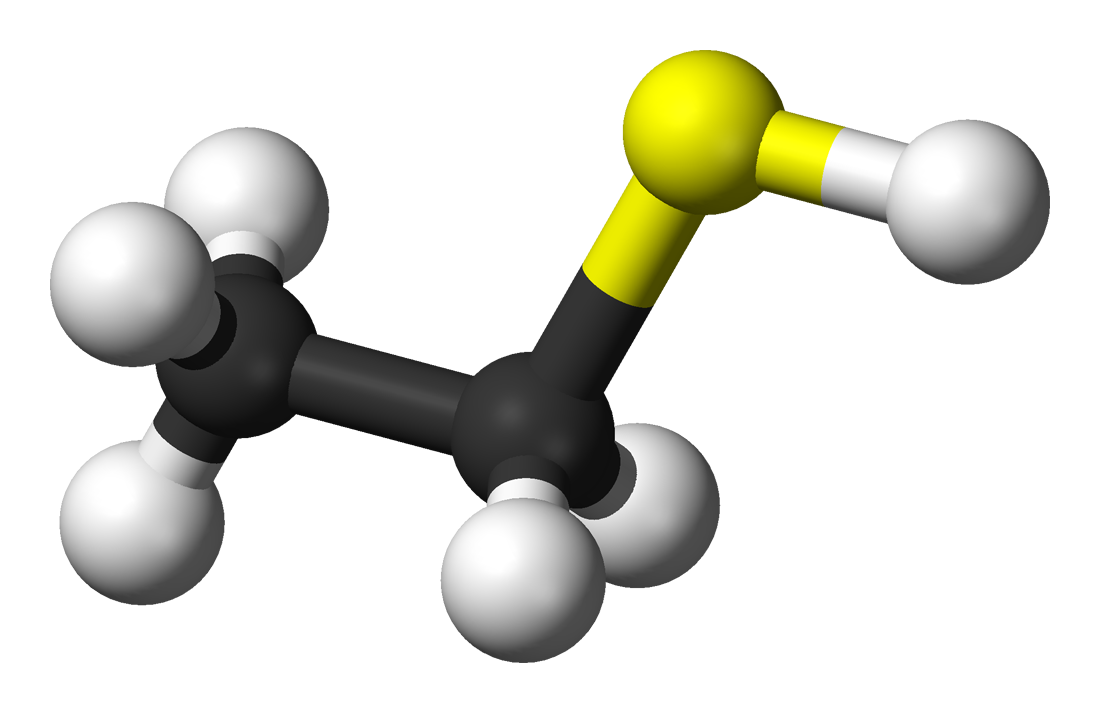
- Ball-and-stick model of the ethanethiol molecule

Names
- Preferred IUPAC name Ethanethiol
- Other names: Ethyl mercaptan; Mercaptoethane; Ethyl sulfhydrate

Identifiers
| CAS Number | 75-08-1 |
| 3D model (JSmol) | Interactive image |
| Abbreviations | EM; EtSH |
| ChEBI | CHEBI:46511 |
| ChemSpider | 6103 |
| ECHA InfoCard | 100.000.762 |
| EC Number | 200-837-3 |
| PubChem CID | 6343 |
| RTECS number | KI9625000 |
| UNII | M439R54A1D |
| UN number | 2363 |
| CompTox Dashboard (EPA) | DTXSID9026394 |
- InChI: InChI=1S/C2H6S/c1-2-3/h3H,2H2,1H3 Key: DNJIEGIFACGWOD-UHFFFAOYSA-N; InChI=1/C2H6S/c1-2-3/h3H,2H2,1H3 Key: DNJIEGIFACGWOD-UHFFFAOYAW
- SMILES: CCS

Properties
| Chemical formula | C_{2}H_{6}S |
| Molar mass | 62.13 g·mol^{−1} |
| Appearance | Colorless liquid |
| Odor | Rotten cabbage, flatulence, skunk-like |
| Density | 0.8617 g·cm^{−3} |
| Melting point | −148 °C (−234 °F; 125 K) |
| Boiling point | 35 °C (95 °F; 308 K) |
| Solubility in water | 0.7% (20 °C) |
| Vapor pressure | 442 mmHg (20 °C) |
| Acidity (pK_{a}) | 10.6 |
| Magnetic susceptibility (χ) | −47.0×10^{−6} cm^{3}/mol |

Hazards
- Occupational safety and health (OHS/OSH)
| Main hazards | Nauseating |
- GHS labelling
| Pictograms | (GHS02: Flammable) (GHS07: Exclamation mark) (GHS09: Environmental hazard) |
| Signal word | Danger |
| Hazard statements | H225, H332, H410 |
| Precautionary statements | P210, P233, P240, P241, P242, P243, P261, P271, P273, P280, P303+P361+P353, P304+P312, P304+P340, P312, P370+P378, P391, P403+P235, P501 |
| NFPA 704 (fire diamond) | 2 4 0 |
| Flash point | −48 °C; −55 °F; 225 K |
| Explosive limits | 2.8–18.0% |
- Lethal dose or concentration (LD, LC)
| LD_{50} (median dose) | 682 mg/kg (rat, oral) |
| LC_{50} (median concentration) | 4410 ppm (rat, 4 hr); 2770 ppm (mouse, 4 hr) |
- NIOSH (US health exposure limits)
| PEL (Permissible) | C 10 ppm (25 mg/m^{3}) |
| REL (Recommended) | C 0.5 ppm (1.3 mg/m^{3}) [15-minute] |
| IDLH (Immediate danger) | 500 ppm |

Related compounds
| Related compounds | Methanethiol; Butanethiol; Ethanol; Thiophenol |
- Except where otherwise noted, data are given for materials in their standard state (at 25 °C [77 °F], 100 kPa). verify (what is ?) Infobox references

Ethanethiol, commonly known as ethyl mercaptan, is an organosulfur compound with the formula C_{2}H_{6}S or CH_{3}CH_{2}SH. It is a colorless liquid with a distinct odor. Abbreviated EtSH, it consists of an ethyl group (Et), CH_{3}CH_{2}, attached to a thiol group, SH. Its structure parallels that of ethanol, but with sulfur in place of oxygen. The odor of EtSH is infamous. Ethanethiol is more volatile than ethanol due to a diminished ability to engage in hydrogen bonding. Ethanethiol is toxic in high concentrations. It occurs naturally as a minor component of petroleum, and may be added to otherwise odorless gaseous products such as liquefied petroleum gas (LPG) to help warn of gas leaks. At these concentrations, ethanethiol is not harmful.

== Preparation ==
Ethanethiol is prepared by the reaction of ethylene with hydrogen sulfide in the presence of various catalysts. It is also prepared commercially by the reaction of ethanol with hydrogen sulfide gas over an acidic solid catalyst, such as alumina.

=== Historic methods ===
Ethanethiol was originally reported by Zeise in 1834. Zeise treated calcium ethyl sulfate with a suspension of barium sulfide saturated with hydrogen sulfide. He is credited with naming the C_{2}H_{5}S- group as mercaptum.

Ethanethiol can also be prepared by a halide displacement reaction, where ethyl halide is treated with aqueous sodium bisulfide. This conversion was demonstrated as early as 1840 by Henri Victor Regnault.

== Odor ==
Ethanethiol has a strongly disagreeable odor that humans can detect in minute concentrations. The threshold for human detection is as low as one part in 2.8 billion parts of air (0.36 parts per billion). Its odor resembles that of leeks, onions, durian or cooked cabbage.

Employees of the Union Oil Company of California reported first in 1938 that turkey vultures would gather at the site of any gas leak. After finding that this was caused by traces of ethanethiol in the gas it was decided to boost the amount of ethanethiol in the gas, to make detection of leaks easier.

== Uses ==
Ethanethiol is intentionally added to butane and propane (see: LPG) to impart an easily noticed smell to these normally odorless fuels that pose the threat of fire, explosion, and asphyxiation.

In the underground mining industry, ethanethiol or ethyl mercaptan is referred to as "stench gas". The gas is released into mine ventilation systems during an emergency to alert mine workers. In Ontario, mining legislation dictates that "The alarm system in an underground mine shall, consist of the introduction into all workplaces of sufficient quantities of ethyl mercaptan gas or similar gas to be readily detectable by all workers".

== Reactions ==
Ethanethiol is a reagent in organic synthesis. In the presence of sodium hydroxide, it gives the powerful nucleophile EtS^{−}. The salt sodium ethanethiolate can be generated quantitatively by reaction of ethanethiol with a suspension of sodium hydride in dimethylformamide.

Ethanethiol can be oxidized to ethyl sulfonic acid, using strong oxidizing agents. Weaker oxidants, such as ferric oxide or hydrogen peroxide give the disulfide, diethyl disulfide:

2 EtSH + H_{2}O_{2} → EtS-SEt + 2 H_{2}O

Like other thiols, it behaves comparably to hydrogen sulfide. For example, it binds, concomitant with deprotonation to "soft" transition metal cations, such as Hg^{2+}, Cu^{+}, and Ni^{2+} to give polymeric thiolato complexes, Hg(SEt)_{2}, CuSEt, and Ni(SEt)_{2}, respectively.

== See also ==
- tert-Butylthiol (tert-butyl mercaptan)
- Butanethiol (butyl mercaptan)
