= Butane-1-thiol =

Organosulfur compound (C4H9SH)

- Skeletal formula

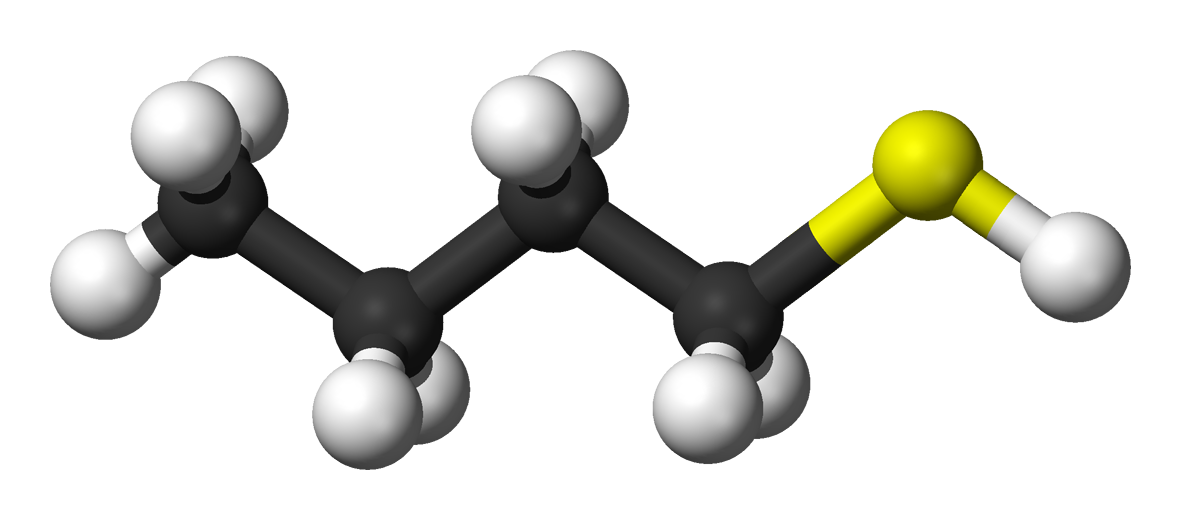
- Ball-and-stick model

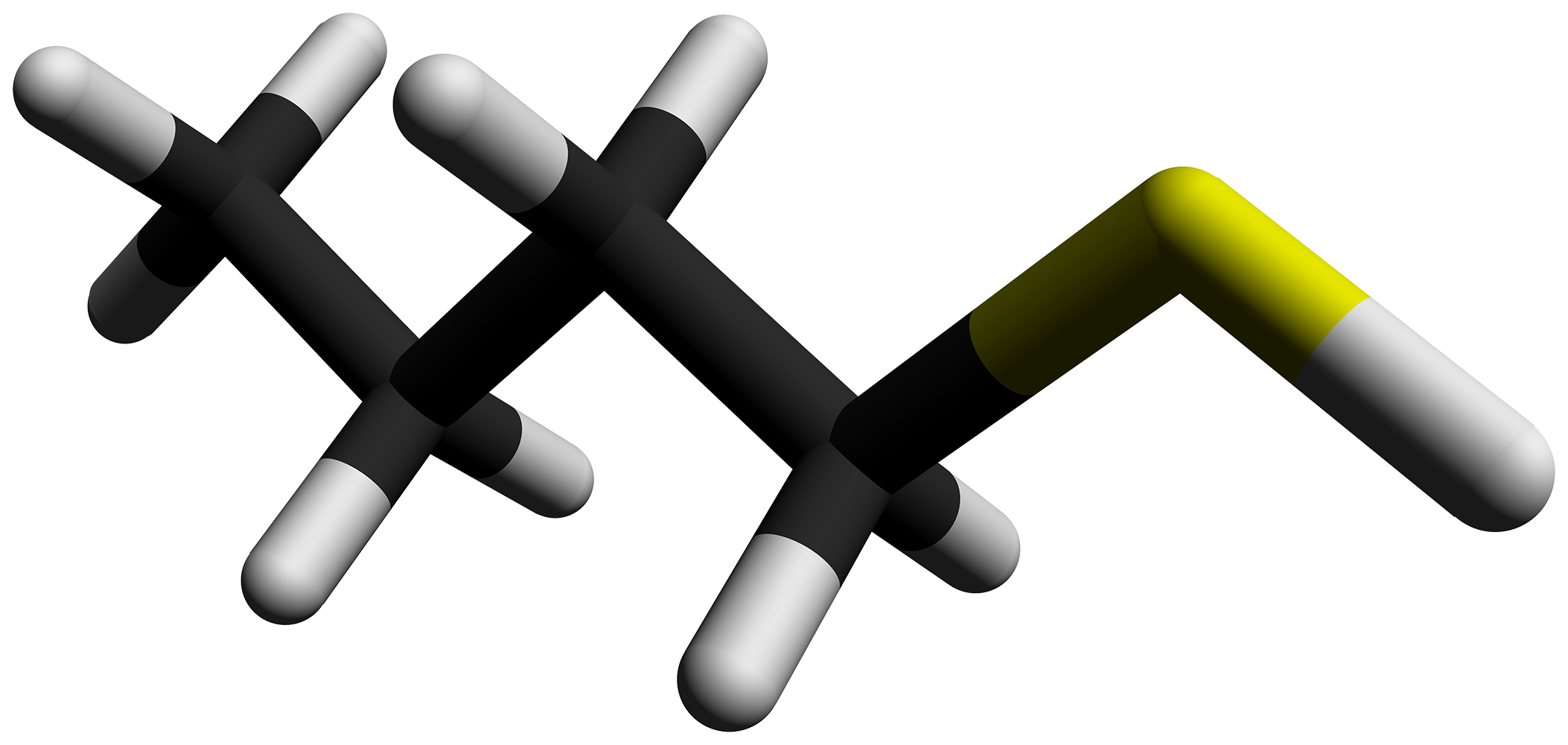
- 3D-stick model

Names
- Preferred IUPAC name Butane-1-thiol
- Other names: Butyl mercaptan; n-Butyl mercaptan; Thiobutyl alcohol; Mercaptobutane; n-Butanethiol; 1-Mercaptobutane

Identifiers
CAS Number	109-79-5
3D model (JSmol)	Interactive image
ChemSpider	7721
ECHA InfoCard	100.003.370
PubChem CID	8012
UNII	77OY909F30
CompTox Dashboard (EPA)	DTXSID6026824
- InChI: InChI=1S/C4H10S/c1-2-3-4-5/h5H,2-4H2,1H3 Key: WQAQPCDUOCURKW-UHFFFAOYSA-N; InChI=1/C4H10S/c1-2-3-4-5/h5H,2-4H2,1H3 Key: WQAQPCDUOCURKW-UHFFFAOYAG
- SMILES: SCCCC

Properties
Chemical formula	C_{4}H_{10}S
Molar mass	90.18 g·mol^{−1}
Appearance	colorless liquid
Odor	cabbage-like, skunk-like, garlic-like
Density	0.83679 g/mL
Melting point	−115.8 °C (−176.4 °F; 157.3 K)
Boiling point	98.2 °C (208.8 °F; 371.3 K)
Solubility in water	Slightly soluble (0.06% at 20°C)
Vapor pressure	35 mmHg (20°C)

Hazards
NFPA 704 (fire diamond)	2 3 0
Flash point	2 °C; 35 °F; 275 K
- Lethal dose or concentration (LD, LC)
LC_{50} (median concentration)	4020 ppm (rat, 4 hr); 2500 ppm (mouse, 4 hr); 770 ppm (dog, 30 min)
- NIOSH (US health exposure limits)
PEL (Permissible)	TWA 10 ppm (35 mg/m^{3})
REL (Recommended)	C 0.5 ppm (1.8 mg/m^{3}) [15-minute]
IDLH (Immediate danger)	500 ppm
- Except where otherwise noted, data are given for materials in their standard state (at 25 °C [77 °F], 100 kPa). verify (what is ?) Infobox references

Butane-1-thiol, also known as butyl mercaptan, is an organosulfur compound with the formula C_{4}H_{10}S or CH_{3}CH_{2}CH_{2}CH_{2}SH. It is classified as a thiol. It is a volatile, colorless liquid with a fetid (extremely foul-smelling) odor, commonly described as "skunk" odor. In fact, 1-butanethiol is structurally similar to several constituents of a skunk's defensive spray but is not present in the spray. The scent of 1-butanethiol is so strong that the human nose can easily detect it in the air at concentrations as low as 10 parts per billion. The threshold level for 1-butanethiol is reported as 1.4 ppb

== Uses ==
Butane-1-thiol is used as an industrial solvent, and as an intermediate for cotton defoliants. It is sometimes placed in "stink bombs" and "stink perfumes" for pranksters.

== Safety ==
Inhalation may cause weakness, confusion, cough, dizziness, drowsiness, headache, nausea, vomiting, and shortness of breath. The substance irritates the eyes, the skin, and the respiratory tract. It may cause effects on the thyroid and the nervous system and could cause lowering of consciousness.

== See also ==
- tert-Butylthiol (tert-butyl mercaptan)
