= Tert-Butylthiol =

tert-Butylthiol
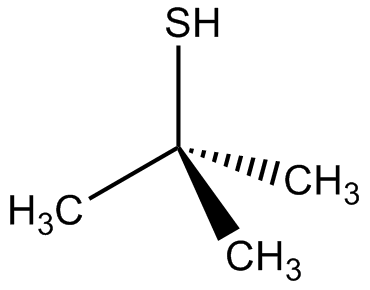

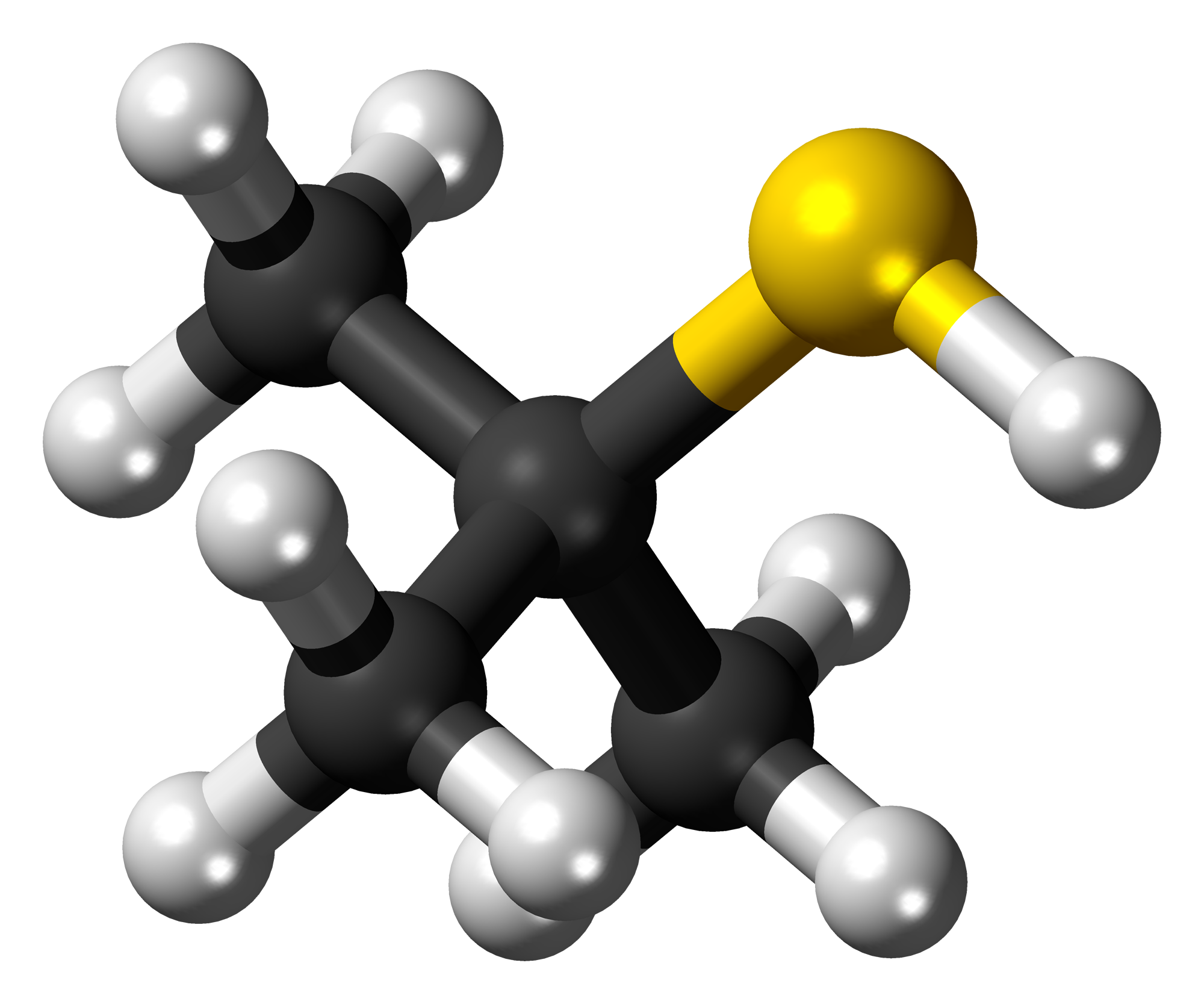

Names
- Preferred IUPAC name 2-Methylpropane-2-thiol
- Other names t-BuSH; 2-Methylpropane-2-thiol; 2-Methyl-2-propanethiol tert-Butyl mercaptan

Identifiers
CAS Number	75-66-1
3D model (JSmol)	Interactive image
Abbreviations	TBM; Me_{3}CSH t-BuSH tBuSH^{t}BuSH
ChemSpider	6147
ECHA InfoCard	100.000.810
PubChem CID	6387
UNII	489PW92WIV
CompTox Dashboard (EPA)	DTXSID0026418
- InChI: InChI=1S/C4H10S/c1-4(2,3)5/h5H,1-3H3 Key: WMXCDAVJEZZYLT-UHFFFAOYSA-N; InChI=1/C4H10S/c1-4(2,3)5/h5H,1-3H3 Key: WMXCDAVJEZZYLT-UHFFFAOYAT
- SMILES: SC(C)(C)C

Properties
Chemical formula	(CH_{3})_{3}CSH
Molar mass	90.18 g·mol^{−1}
Appearance	Colorless liquid
Density	0.8 g/mL
Melting point	−0.50 °C (31.10 °F; 272.65 K)
Boiling point	62 to 65 °C (144 to 149 °F; 335 to 338 K)

Hazards
- GHS labelling
Pictograms	(GHS02: Flammable) (GHS07: Exclamation mark) (GHS08: Health hazard) (GHS09: Environmental hazard)
Signal word	Danger
Hazard statements	H225, H304, H317, H319, H411
Precautionary statements	P210, P233, P240, P241, P242, P243, P261, P264+P265, P272, P273, P280, P301+P316, P302+P352, P303+P361+P353, P305+P351+P338, P321, P331, P333+P317, P337+P317, P362+P364, P370+P378, P391, P403+P235, P405, P501

Related compounds
Related compounds	tert-Butyl alcohol
- Except where otherwise noted, data are given for materials in their standard state (at 25 °C [77 °F], 100 kPa). verify (what is ?) Infobox references

tert-Butylthiol, also known as tert-butyl mercaptan (TBM), and abbreviated t-BuSH, is an organosulfur compound with the formula (CH_{3})_{3}CSH. This thiol has a strong odor. It is considered a flavoring agent.

== Preparation ==
tert-Butylthiol was first prepared in 1890 by Leonard Dobbin by the reaction of zinc sulfide and t-butyl chloride.

The compound was later prepared by the reaction of the Grignard reagent, t-BuMgCl, with sulfur to give the corresponding thiolate, followed by hydrolysis. This preparation is shown below:

t-BuMgCl + S → t-BuSMgCl
t-BuSMgCl + H_{2}O → t-BuSH + Mg(OH)Cl

It is made industrially by the reaction of isobutylene with hydrogen sulfide over a clay (silica alumina) catalyst.

== Reactions ==
tert-Butylthiol is deprotonated by lithium hydride in an aprotic solvent such as hexamethylphosphoramide (HMPA). The resulting lithium thiolate salt has been used as demethylating reagent. For example, treatment with 7-methylguanosine gives guanosine. Other N-methylated nucleosides in tRNA are not demethylated by this reagent.

tert-Butylthiol reacts with thallium(I) ethoxide to give the thallium thiolate:

(CH_{3})_{3}CSH + CH_{3}CH_{2}O^{−}Tl^{+} → (CH_{3})_{3}CS^{−}Tl^{+} + CH_{3}CH_{2}OH

This thallium thiolate can be used to convert acyl chlorides to the thioester:

(CH_{3})_{3}CS^{−}Tl^{+} + RCOCl → RCOSC(CH_{3})_{3} + TlCl

(CH_{3})_{3}CSLi reacts with MoCl_{4} with to give the tetrathiolate complex:

MoCl_{4} + 4 (CH_{3})_{3}CSLi → ((CH_{3})_{3}CS)_{4}Mo + 4 LiCl

== Commercial use and occurrence ==
tert-Butylthiol is the main ingredient in many gas odorant blends. It is always utilized as a blend of other compounds, typically dimethyl sulfide, methyl ethyl sulfide, tetrahydrothiophene or other mercaptans such as isopropyl mercaptan, sec-butyl mercaptan and/or n-butyl mercaptan, due to its rather high melting point of −0.5 °C (31.1 °F). These blends are used only with natural gas and not propane, as the boiling points of these blends and propane are quite different. Because propane is delivered as a liquid and vaporizes to gas when it is delivered to the appliance, the vapor liquid equilibrium would substantially reduce the amount of odorant blend in the vapor.

=== Food and flavor ===
tert-Butylthiol had been listed on the European Food Safety Authority (FL-no: 12.174) as a flavor additive. There is no indication of what flavor(s) it may have been used in. It has been removed from this list.

tert-Butylthiol is a very minor component of cooked potatoes.

== Safety ==
The threshold limit value (TLV) is 0.5 ppm. tert-butylthiol has an odor threshold of <0.33 ppb.

== See also ==
- Butanethiol (butyl mercaptan)
- Ethanethiol (ethyl mercaptan)
