= Stinkpot =

Stinkpot may mean:

- Alternative common name for the common musk turtle
- Alternative common name for the southern giant petrel
- An incendiary weapon used in the 19th century by Qing dynasty Chinese sailors against British ships during the Second Opium War.
- Slang term referring to a motorboat (usually used by sailors)
- Stink bomb, a device to create an offensive smell
