= Jean-Charles Perrinet d'Orval =

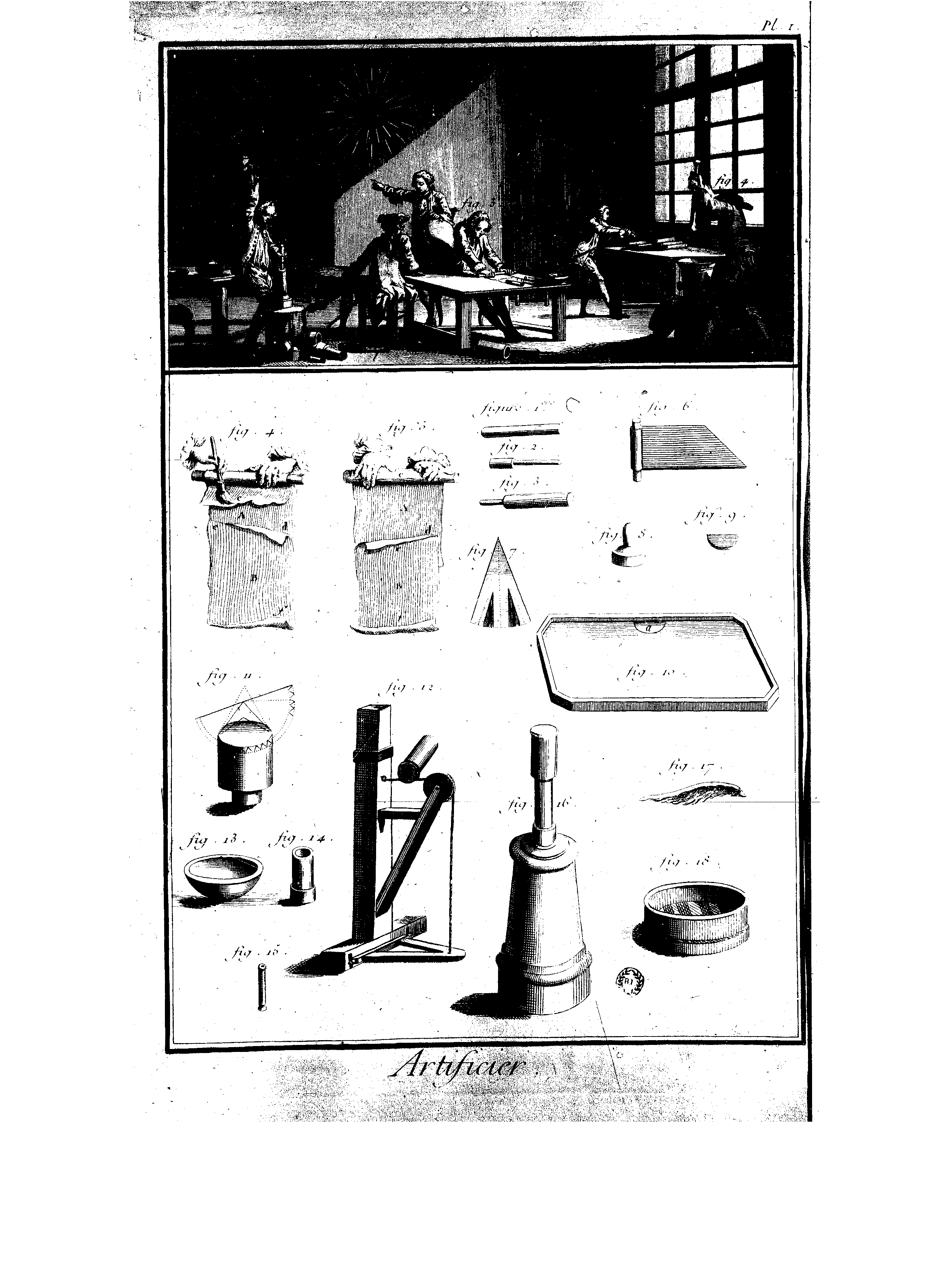
Plate Artificier of the Encyclopédie, t. 1., p. 325.

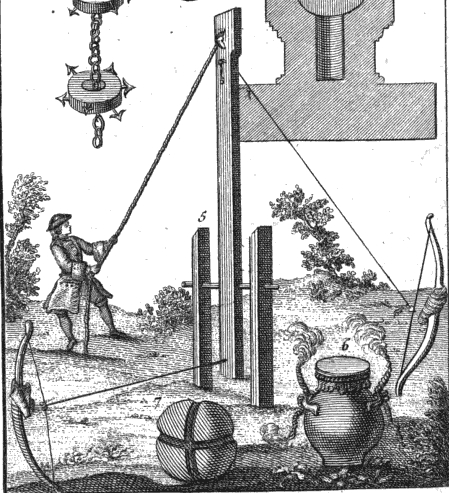
A depiction demonstrating the use of the Chinese stinkpot shown in the Treaty on fireworks for shows and for war by Jean-Charles Perrinet d'Orval, 1745

Jean-Charles Perrinet d’Orval (1707, Sancerre – 5 May 1782, Paris) was a French chemical engineer and pyrotechnician.

== Biography ==
Perrinet d'Orval was the son of Jean Perrinet d'Orval (1670–1729) and Madeleine Annes (died 1758). Jean Perrinet d'Orval was married two times, his first wife was Suzanne Chamaillard (1658–1705). From this first marriage he had four children: Jean Robert Perrinet (1696–1696), Marianne Perrinet d'Orval (born 1697), Jean Perrinet (born 1699) and Benjamin Perrinet (born 1700).

From his second marriage he had five other children: Jean Charles Perrinet d’Orval (born 1707), Pierre Perrinet de Faugnes (1710−1773), Anne Perrinet d’Orval, Madeleine-Marguerite Perrinet d’Orval and Etienne Perrinet du Bignon.

In addition to Amédée-François Frézier (1682–1773), Perrinet d'Orval was of the most important pyrotechnicians of his era, who also thought about the military utility of explosives and gunpowder. His works were conceived as practical manuals and instructions and demonstrated the high level of craftsmanship of pyrotechnics in the early modern period.

Capitoul of Toulouse from 1758 to 1762, Perrinet wrote some books on pyrotechnics, of which he made a special study, books in which Diderot et d'Alembert drew information for the articles of the Encyclopédie that dealt with this part.

By judgment of 12 June 1743, Perrinet Orval, salt store recipient of Sancerre and Stephen Renouard, master of water and forests of the Sancerre County, are in dispute with Jean et Étienne Ravot, merchants of Orleans, about the liquidation of an inheritance (1743–1745).

== Works (selection) ==
- 1745: Essai sur les feux d’artifice. Paris in-8°, fig.
- 1750: Traité des feux d’artifice pour le spectacle et pour la guerre. Bern, 1750, in-8°, fig.
- 1757: Manuel de l’artificier. Neufchâtel, 1755, in-8°, fig.

== Sources ==
- Ferdinand Hoefer, Nouvelle Biographie générale, t. 39, Paris, Firmin-Didot, 1862, (p. 650).
- Vincent Poupard: Histoire de Sancerre. 2nd ed, Bourges, 1838, (p. 192–193)
