= Julius de Berry =

Julius de Berry may have been a minor French nobleman, natural from either Normandy or Bourbonnais and a citizen of Auvers (i.e. Antwerp) who was knighted by the Emperor and King of France, Charles Simplex, in 916 for a gift of ripe strawberries. Legend has it that Julius' strawberries were so succulent, that King Charles granted him a coat of arms, which comes down to the present as the arms of the Scottish Clan Fraser, who are traditionally believed, amongst other theories, to descend from Julius.

== See also ==
- Amédée-François Frézier
