= Stink Blasters =

Toy line of odorous dolls

- Type: Figurines
- Invented by: MEG Toys (Note: Acronym for "Morrison Entertainment Group".)
- Company: MEG Toys
- Country: United States
- Availability: 2002–05
- Materials: Plastic

Stink Blasters are a children's figurine line manufactured by Morrison Entertainment Group (MEG Toys) and distributed in thirty-four countries. The toys were first released in the early 2000s, with Series 2 released in 2005 and a limited-release Series 3. The original line consisted of 24 collectable figures per each of the two series, which release unpleasant odors when squeezed. In 2024 they were relaunched with a small collection.

== Characteristics ==
The figures are three-inch depictions of "grungy" boy characters with cartoonishly grotesque faces. They feature a hard, small plastic body and a large, hollow rubber head. When the head is lightly squeezed, a small hole, usually located near the mouth, emits a stench. According to the producer, the dolls could be squeezed over 30,000 times before losing their scents.

MEG has never explicitly described what goes into making the scents, citing fear of knock off brands. According to the company, the scent formulas were about 95 percent polypropylene glycol, and 5 percent oils, food flavorings and extracts. The emission of toxic cyclohexanone and toluene from the toys was kept at levels much lower than established permissible exposure limits, so they are safe. The formulas were made in laboratories in the United States, while the toys were produced in China. MEG is also careful not to include materials that one could be allergic to in the toys.

When the toys were packaged, each came with a plastic "stink containment unit" with a clip to attach it to things for travel, and to avoid losing it. Stink Blasters also came with trading cards that went farther into their backstories, giving them a biography and details on favorite foods and archenemies.

The toys were released with suggested price $4.99, intended for children to afford them with their own allowance money.

== History ==
The toys were first released in 31 countries outside of the United States. In United States, they were first introduced to Chicago in 2003 for test marketing and sold out in almost every major store. The toys were so successful, that it led to a nationwide rollout in February 2004.

These dolls were once a popular toy in the United States. After a few years, however, they slowly disappeared off the market, as the demand for them had slowly declined. They were re-released several years later in the United Kingdom, with some limited success, however, not nearly to the levels once had in the US. They achieved some more success in places like Italy and Australia. Toy collectors try to find the rare toys, which have begun to fetch high prices. They can be found on online auctions, from places such as Europe, as they have nearly fallen into obscurity in the United States.

== Toys ==
=== Series One ===
Stench Bros.

- Garbage Truck Chuck
- Barfin' Ben
- Porta Potty Paul
- Tony Anchovy

Veggies

- Garlic Gus
- Broccoli Bill
- Cauliflower Carl
- Blue Cheese Charlie

Nature Crew

- Cow Pie Pete
- Skunk Punk
- Pig Boy
- Matty Manure

B.O. Boys

- B.O. Brian
- Toe Jam Jimmy
- Sweat Sox Sammy
- Rotten Egg Reggie

Breathers

- Dog Breath Danny
- Fish Mouth Fred
- Lizard Lips Lenny
- Monster Mouth

Gasser Guys

- The Master Blaster
- Burpin' Buddy
- Butt Breath Bob
- The Silent Gasser

=== Series Two ===
Breathers

- Toxic Tyler
- Spewy Huey

Stench Bros.

- Chill E. Dawg Joey
- Never Wash Nick

The Dukes

- The Duke of Puke
- Pizza Face Pat
- Oil Slick Rick
- Dude Boy Doug
- Clammy Cliff
- Dandy Doo Dave

Nature Crew

- Rankin' Ryan
- Wart Hog Henry

The Zoo Crew

- Rat Boy Rob
- Vinnie the Vulture
- Elephant Drop Eric
- Zoo Boy Zach
- Camel Mouth Chris
- Monkey Cage Mike

Veggies

- Jurassic Josh
- Rotten Onion Ollie

B.O. Boys

- Ear Wax Max
- Armpit Andy

Gasser Guys

- Fartasaurus Frank
- Billy Bob Booger

=== Series Three ===
A special Series III of Stink Blasters was produced for test markets. In Series III each figure had its own accessory, which had a scent of its own.

The Band This group revolved entirely around musicians, one of which was a girl, a first for the series. Skunk Punk, the apparent guitarist of the band, was used in Series I.

- Smooth Sounding Sammy
- DD Drum Boy
- Sweet Lips Suzie
- Skunk Punk (previously appeared in Series I)
- G Tar Garry
- Agent Boy Arnie

Smellville's Finest This group focused entirely on the adults of Smellville, also a first for the series.

- Principal Prickly
- Detective Ratzzo
- Poppa Anchovy
- Mayor Poochie
- Chef Grimee
- Coach Grunge

== Scent Stars ==
Scent Stars was a companion line of toys, featuring female dolls with pretty faces and pleasant scents (such as roses, bubble gum, and cinnamon). Vice president of MEG, Daniel Stenton has stated that girls, the target audience of the series, "would not be interested in nasty things", and that "nobody would want to buy a bad smelling female doll, as girls are not known for being grungy". First series consisted of 12 dolls (named Lizzy, Maggie, Olivia, Cindy, Kate, Cookie, Jordy, Trisha, Vanessa, Lily, BeeBee and Jamie), with smaller version of them released as "wearable Scent Stars".

Designs of next 12 figures for series 2 were proposed during release of series 1, and later in some countries a series consisting of 6 of them (Tess, Natalie, Jillian, Courtney, Lucy and Alyssa) was sold.
