= Stinkpot (weapon) =

Qing dynasty weapon

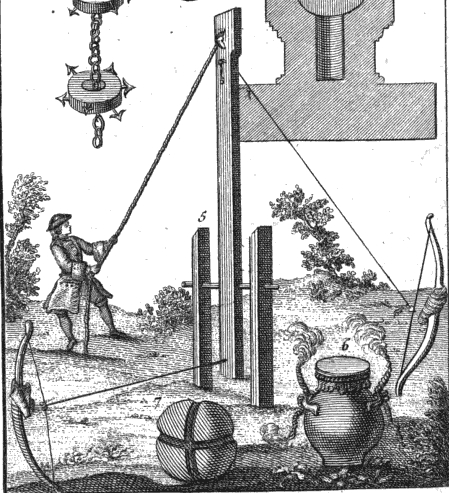
A depiction demonstrating the use of the Chinese stinkpot shown in the Traité sur les feux d'artifice pour le spectacle et pour la guerre by French pyrotechnician Jean-Charles Perrinet d'Orval, 1745

A stinkpot or stink-pot was an incendiary and suffocating weapon used in the 19th century during the Qing dynasty, especially in naval operations. It is an earthenware incendiary weapon part filled with sulphur, gunpowder, nails, and shot, while the other part was filled with noxious materials designed to emanate a highly unpleasant and suffocating smell to its enemies when ignited.

British Admiral Sir William Robert Kennedy recorded the use of the stinkpot in 1856 during the Second Opium War in his book Hurrah for the Life of a Sailor - Fifty Years in the Royal Navy. He described it as:

The stink-pot is an earthenware vessel filled with powder, sulphur, &c. Each junk had cages at the mast-head, which in action were occupied by one or more men, whose duty it was to throw these stinkpots on to the decks of the enemy, or into boats attempting to board; and woe betide any unlucky boat that received one of these missiles: the crew would certainly have to jump overboard or be stifled.

Describing the method of use of the stinkpot, Kennedy writes:

One man ascends the foremast, and one the mizzenmast, all going to the very top and remaining on the highest yard. Two men stand at the foot of each mast and haul up the baskets containing the stink-pots by means of a pulley. Each basket contains ten or more stink-pots, and every pot has 4-pounder rolls enclosed in cotton cases. These being drawn up briskly, the men at the mast-head then apply the matches, when they are instantaneously discharged. When one basket is emptied, another is hauled up, so as to keep up an uninterrupted delivery on board the barbarian ship.

Stinkpots were used in the War of 1812 by the British Navy during a bombardment of Stonington, Connecticut, on August 9, 1814.

Rossiter Johnson in his book, "A History of the War of 1812–1815 between the United States and Great Britain", writes:

It was toward evening when Hardy opened his ports and fired upon the town every kind of missile in use at that day—round-shot, grape-shot, canister, bomb-shells. carcasses, rockets, and stink-pots.

Stinkpots are mentioned in The Siege of Krishnapur, novel by J G Farrell.

== See also ==
- Stink bomb
