= Transition metal complexes of thioaldehydes and thioketones =

Structure of W(CO)_{5}(thiobenzaldehyde). Color code: yellow-orange = S, black = C, blue = W, red = O.

Transition metal complexes of thioaldehydes and thioketones describes coordination complexes with thioaldehyde (RCHS) and thioketone (R_{2}CS) ligands. These organosulfur compounds are uncommon, so the corresponding complexes are relatively few.

== Structure and bonding ==
Structure of Fe_{3}(adamantanethione)(CO)_{9}

In monometallic complexes, thioaldehydes and thioketones usually bind to metals as an η^{2}-C,S ligand, but some feature the monodentate binding mode. In many complexes, the sulfur bridges two or more metals. For the purpose of electron-counting, η^{2}-C,S ligands are somewhat analogous to alkene ligands, i.e. the Dewar-Chatt-Duncanson model. They are also analogous to pi-complexes of aldehydes and ketones.

== Synthesis and reactions ==
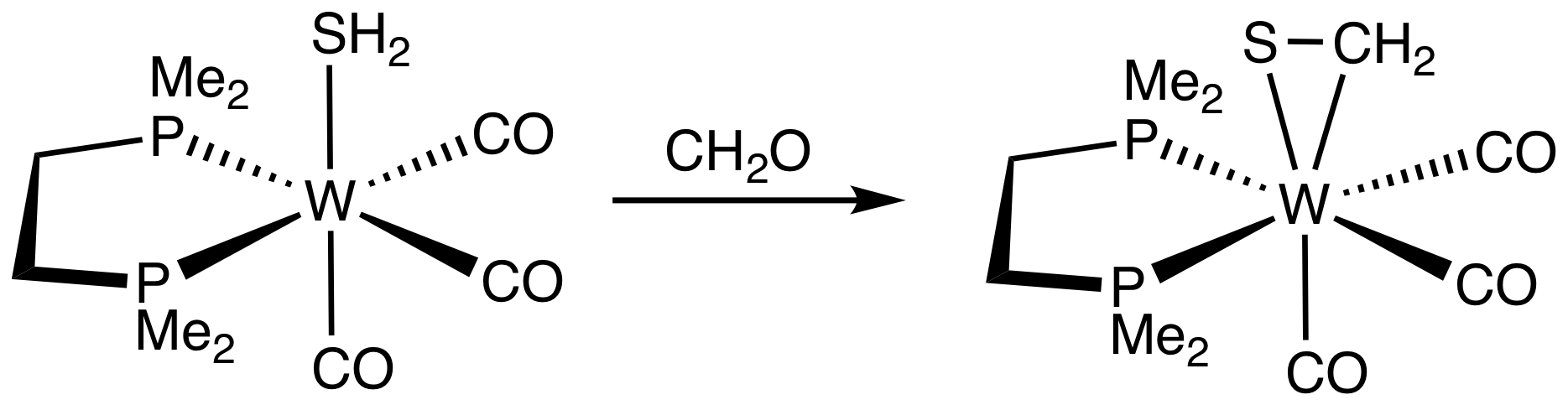
Synthesis of a tungsten thioformaldehyde complex.

Two general approaches exist for the preparation of these complexes: (i) treatment of a metal precursor with the thioketone and (ii) generation of the thio ligand on the metal complex. With regard to the former approach, thioketones, several of which are isolable in monomeric form, react with low-valence metals to give complexes. Thus, iron carbonyl derivatives of thiobenzophenone are well developed. Complexes of adamantanethione arise via degradation of the corresponding 1,2,4-trithiolane. Some thiocarbonyl complexes arise by the reaction of a metal complex of hydrogen sulfide with the carbonyl substrate:

L_{n}M(SH_{2}) + RCHO → L_{n}M(SCHR) + H_{2}O (L = spectator ligand)

Thioaldehyde complexes have been prepared by removal of hydride from the corresponding benzylthiolate, as illustrated by the following reaction involving trityl cation:

CpRe(NO)(PPh_{3})(SCH_{2}Ph) + Ph_{3}C^{+} → [CpRe(NO)(PPh_{3})(SCHPh)]^{+} + Ph_{3}CH (Ph = phenyl, Cp = cyclopentadienyl)

Thioformaldehyde, the simplest thioaldehyde, is not obtainable in the free state. Consequently, complexes of this ligand are instead prepared indirectly. One example is Os(SCH_{2})(CO)_{2}(PPh_{3})_{2}, prepared by hydride transfer to a thiocarbonyl complex.

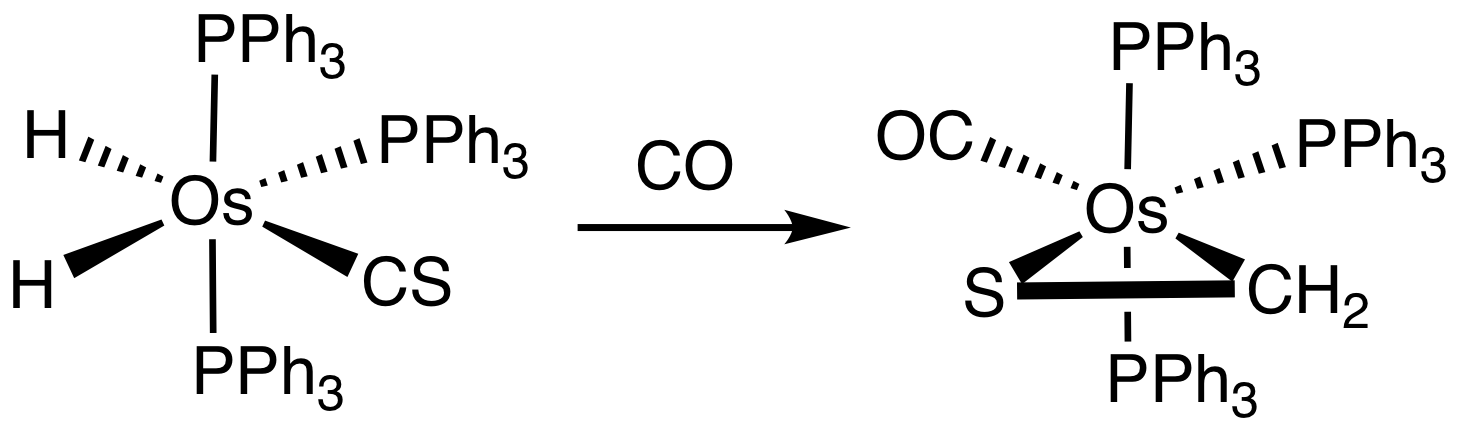
Synthesis of an osmium thioformaldehyde complex.

Metal-thioaldehyde and thioketone complexes exhibit some nucleophilicity at sulfur, allowing S-alkylation.

== Related complexes ==
Still rarer, selenium and tellurium analogues of the above complexes are established. For example, some phenyl carbene complexes react with elemental chalcogens to give thioaldehyde derivatives:

(CO)_{5}W=CHPh + E → (CO)_{5}W(ECHPh) (E = S, Se, Te)

== Other ligands with thiocarbonyl character ==
Dithiolene complexes were originally described as derivatives of 1,2-dithioketones, which are a nonexistent family of organosulfur compounds. Scrutiny by X-ray crystallography reveals that these complexes are highly delocalized and generally are assigned as 1,2-enedithiolates. Dithioacetylacetonates, so-call sacsac complexes are formally derived from pentane-1,3-dione (and related derivatives) by deprotonation. The parent ligands are also unknown. The resulting complexes are also highly delocalized, but are described as thione-ene-thiolates.
