= Thioenol =

Organic compounds with the general structure C=C–SH

General chemical structure of a thioenol

In organic chemistry, thioenols (also known as alkenethiols) are alkenes with a thiol group (−SH) affixed to one of the carbon atoms composing the double bond (i.e. C=C−SH). They are the sulfur analogs of enols (hence the thio- prefix). Alkenes with a thiol group on both atoms of the double bond are called enedithiols. Deprotonated anions of thioenols are called thioenolates.

These structures exhibit tautomerism to give thioketones or thioaldehydes, analogous to keto–enol tautomerism of carbonyl structures.
