= Double bond =

Chemical bond involving four bonding electrons; has one sigma plus one pi bond

In chemistry, a double bond is a covalent bond between two atoms involving four bonding electrons as opposed to two in a single bond. Double bonds occur most commonly between two carbon atoms, for example in alkenes. Many double bonds exist between two different elements: for example, in a carbonyl group between a carbon atom and an oxygen atom. Other common double bonds are found in azo compounds (N=N), imines (C=N), and sulfoxides (S=O). In a skeletal formula, a double bond is drawn as two parallel lines (=) between the two connected atoms; typographically, the equals sign is used for this. Double bonds were introduced in chemical notation by Russian chemist Alexander Butlerov.

Double bonds involving carbon are stronger and shorter than single bonds. The bond order is two. Double bonds are also electron-rich, which makes them potentially more reactive in the presence of a strong electron acceptor (as in addition reactions of the halogens).

Chemical compounds with double bonds

Ethylene carbon–carbon double bond

Acetone carbon–oxygen double bond

Dimethyl sulfoxide sulfur–oxygen double bond

Diazene nitrogen–nitrogen double bond

== Double bonds in alkenes ==
Geometry of ethylene

The type of bonding can be explained in terms of orbital hybridisation. In ethylene each carbon atom has three sp^{2} orbitals and one p-orbital. The three sp^{2} orbitals lie in a plane with ~120° angles. The p-orbital is perpendicular to this plane. When the carbon atoms approach each other, two of the sp^{2} orbitals overlap to form a sigma bond. At the same time, the two p-orbitals approach (again in the same plane) and together they form a pi bond. For maximum overlap, the p-orbitals have to remain parallel, and, therefore, rotation around the central bond is not possible. This property gives rise to cis-trans isomerism. Double bonds are shorter than single bonds because p-orbital overlap is maximized.

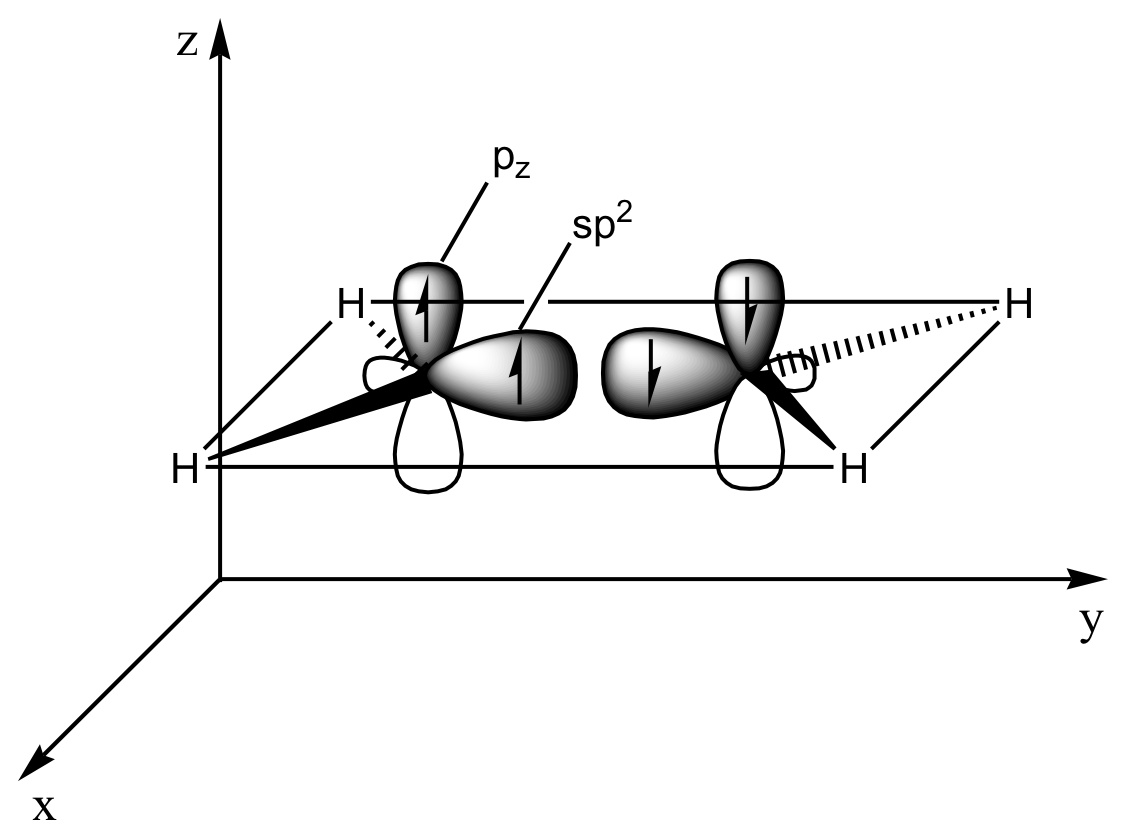
2 sp^{2} orbitals (total of 3 such orbitals) approach to form a sp^{2}-sp^{2} sigma bond

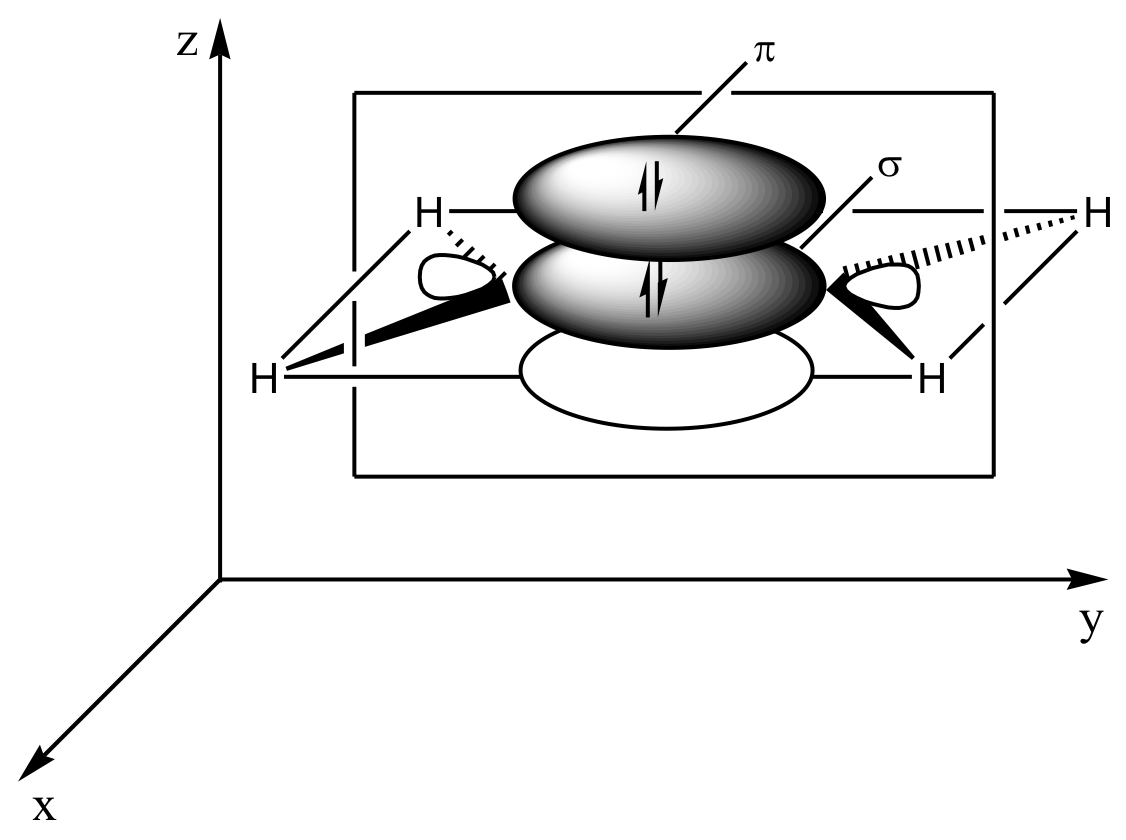
Two p-orbitals overlap to form a pi-bond in a plane parallel to the sigma plane

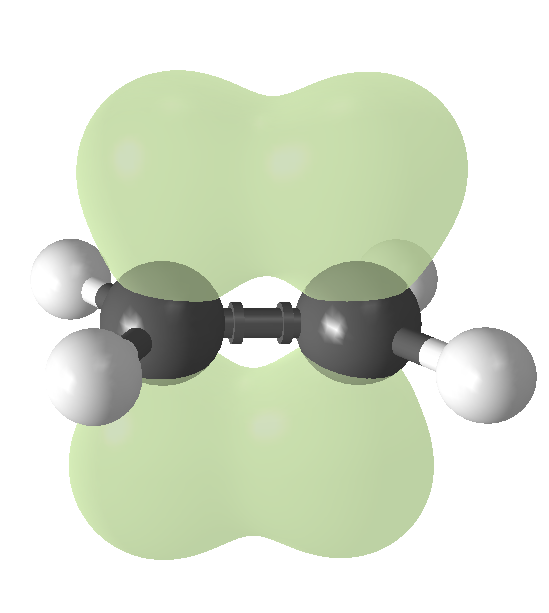
Pi bond (green) in ethylene

With 133 pm, the ethylene C=C bond length is shorter than the C−C length in ethane with 154 pm. The double bond is also stronger, 636 kJ mol^{−1} versus 368 kJ mol^{−1} but not twice as much as the pi-bond is weaker than the sigma bond due to less effective pi-overlap.

In an alternative representation, the double bond results from two overlapping sp^{3} orbitals as in a bent bond.

== Variations ==
In molecules with alternating double bonds and single bonds, p-orbital overlap can exist over multiple atoms in a chain, giving rise to a conjugated system. Conjugation can be found in systems such as dienes and enones. In cyclic molecules, conjugation can lead to aromaticity. In cumulenes, two double bonds are adjacent and do not overlap with each other.

Double bonds are common for period 2 elements carbon, nitrogen, and oxygen, and less common with elements of higher periods, a distinction called the double bond rule. Metals, too, can engage in multiple bonding in a metal–ligand multiple bond.

== Group 14 alkene homologues ==
Double bonded compounds, alkene homologues, R_{2}E=ER_{2} are now known for all of the heavier group 14 elements. Unlike the alkenes these compounds are not planar but adopt twisted and/or trans bent structures. These effects become more pronounced for the heavier elements. The distannene (Me_{3}Si)_{2}CHSn=SnCH(SiMe_{3})_{2} has a tin-tin bond length just a little shorter than a single bond, a trans bent structure with pyramidal coordination at each tin atom, and readily dissociates in solution to form (Me_{3}Si)_{2}CHSn: (stannanediyl, a carbene analog). The bonding comprises two weak donor acceptor bonds, the lone pair on each tin atom overlapping with the empty p orbital on the other. In contrast, in disilenes each silicon atom has planar coordination but the substituents are twisted so that the molecule as a whole is not planar. In diplumbenes the Pb=Pb bond length can be longer than that of many corresponding single bonds Plumbenes and stannenes generally dissociate in solution into monomers with bond enthalpies that are just a fraction of the corresponding single bonds. Some double bonds plumbenes and stannenes are similar in strength to hydrogen bonds. The Carter–Goddard–Malrieu–Trinquier model can be used to predict the nature of the bonding.

== Types of double bonds between atoms ==
	C	O	N	S	Si	Ge	Sn	Pb
C	alkene	carbonyl group	imine	thioketone, thial	alkylidenesilanes			
O		dioxygen	nitroso compound	sulfoxide, sulfone, sulfinic acid, sulfonic acid				
N			azo compound					
S				disulfur				
Si					silenes			
Ge						germenes		
Sn							stannenes	
Pb								plumbenes
