= C13H10S =

The molecular formula C_{13}H_{10}S (molar mass: 198.28 g/mol, exact mass: 198.0503 u) may refer to:

- Thiobenzophenone
- Thioxanthene
