= Boron sulfide =

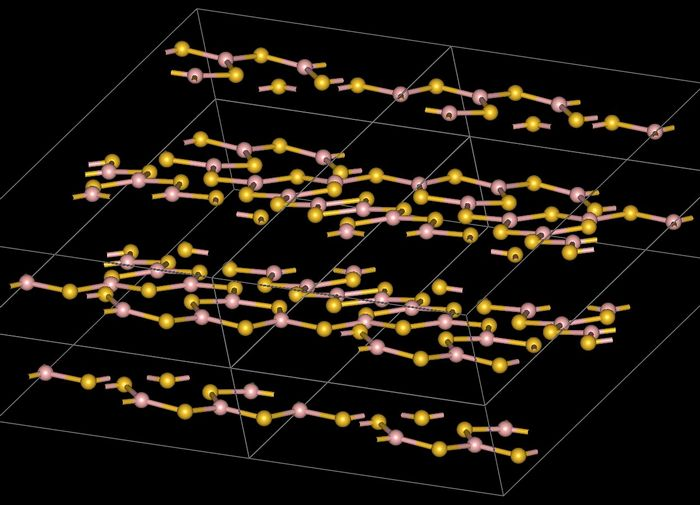

Names
- IUPAC name Boron sulfide
- Other names Boron sesquisulfide, Diboron trisulfide

Identifiers
| CAS Number | 12007-33-9 |
| 3D model (JSmol) | Interactive image |
| ChemSpider | 23349327 |
| ECHA InfoCard | 100.031.355 |
| EC Number | 234-504-9 |
| PubChem CID | 123269 |
| CompTox Dashboard (EPA) | DTXSID50923210 |
- InChI: InChI=1S/B2S3/c3-1-5-2-4 Key: ZVTQDOIPKNCMAR-UHFFFAOYSA-N
- SMILES: S=BSB=S

Properties
| Chemical formula | B_{2}S_{3} |
| Molar mass | 117.80 g/mol |
| Appearance | colorless crystals |
| Density | 1.55 g/cm^{3}, solid |
| Melting point | 563 °C (1,045 °F; 836 K) |
| Boiling point | decomposes at high T |
| Solubility in water | decomposes |
| Solubility | soluble in ammonia |

Structure
| Crystal structure | monoclinic, mP40, SpaceGroup = P2_{1}/c, No. 14 |
| Coordination geometry | B: planar, sp^{2} |

Thermochemistry
| Heat capacity (C) | 111.7 J/mol K |
| Std molar entropy (S^{⦵}_{298}) | 327 J/mol K |
| Std enthalpy of formation (Δ_{f}H^{⦵}_{298}) | −240.6 kJ/mol |

Hazards
- Occupational safety and health (OHS/OSH)
| Main hazards | source of H_{2}S |
- GHS labelling
| Pictograms | (GHS02: Flammable) (GHS06: Toxic) (GHS07: Exclamation mark) |
| Signal word | Danger |
| Hazard statements | H225, H260, H301, H311, H315, H318, H335 |
| Precautionary statements | P210, P223, P231+P232, P280, P302+P352, P303+P361+P353, P305+P351+P338, P312, P402+P404, P405 |
| NFPA 704 (fire diamond) | 2 3 3 |
| Flash point | 18 °C (64 °F; 291 K) |
| Safety data sheet (SDS) | trc-canada.com |

Related compounds
| Related compounds | BCl_{3} Lawesson's reagent |
- Except where otherwise noted, data are given for materials in their standard state (at 25 °C [77 °F], 100 kPa). verify (what is ?) Infobox references

Boron sulfide is the chemical compound with the formula B_{2}S_{3}. It is a white, moisture-sensitive solid. It has a polymeric structure. The material has been of interest as a component of "high-tech" glasses and as a reagent for preparing organosulfur compounds. It is the parent member of the thioborates.

== Reactions ==
Like the sulfides of silicon and phosphorus, B_{2}S_{3} reacts with traces of water, including atmospheric moisture to release H_{2}S. This hydrolysis is described by the following idealized equation:

B_{2}S_{3} + 3 H_{2}O → B_{2}O_{3} + 3 H_{2}S

B_{2}S_{3} readily forms glasses when blended with other sulfides such as P_{4}S_{10}. Such glasses do not absorb mid-frequencies of Infra-red energy relative to conventional borosilicate glasses. Some of these ternary phases that are fast ion conductors.

B_{2}S_{3} converts ketones into the corresponding thiones. For example, the conversion of benzophenone to its thione proceeds as follows:

B_{2}S_{3} + 3 (C_{6}H_{5})_{2}C=O → B_{2}O_{3} + 3 (C_{6}H_{5})_{2}C=S

In practice, B_{2}S_{3} would be used in excess.

== Synthesis ==
An early synthesis involved the reaction of iron and manganese borides with hydrogen sulfide at temperatures of 300 °C. The conversion is shown for the monoborides in the following idealized equation:

2 FeB + 4 H_{2}S → B_{2}S_{3} + FeS + 4 H_{2}

The first synthesis was done by Jöns Jakob Berzelius in 1824 by direct reaction of amorphous boron with sulfur vapor.

2 B + 3 S → B_{2}S_{3}

Another synthesis was favoured by Friedrich Wöhler and Henri Etienne Sainte-Claire Deville first published in 1858, starting from boron and hydrogen sulfide.

2 B + 3 H_{2}S → B_{2}S_{3} + 3 H_{2}

== Structure ==
The boron atoms in B_{2}S_{3} are trigonal planar, and are arranged in B_{3}S_{3} and B_{2}S_{2} rings with bridging S atoms forming a layer structure with an interlayer distance of 355 pm. This is different from boron trioxide which has a three dimensional structure. The molecular, monomeric, form of B_{2}S_{3} has a planar V shape with the central B-S-B angle of approximately 120°.
