= Bis(trimethylsilyl)sulfide =

- Stereo structural formula of bis(trimethylsilyl)sulfide

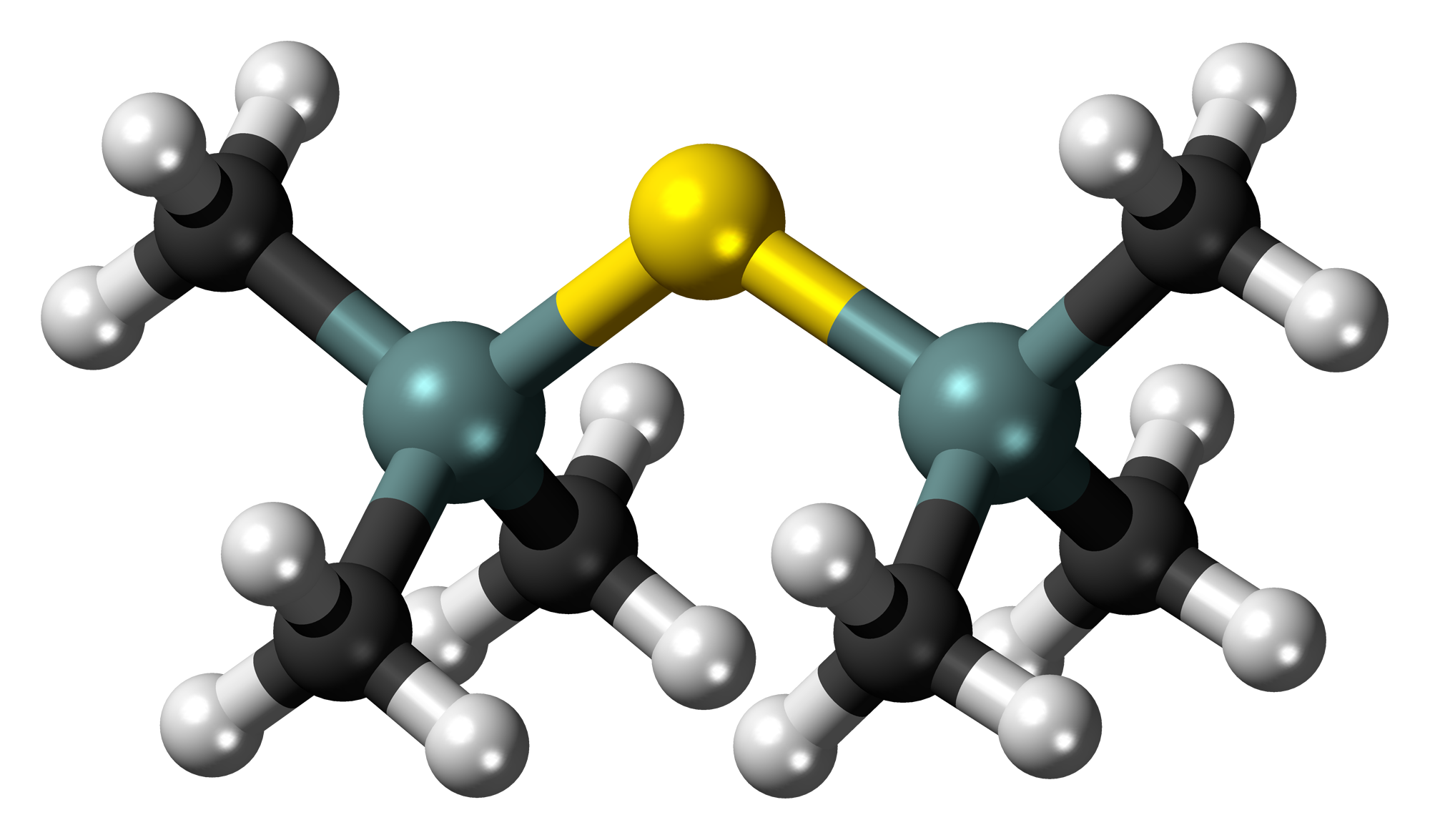

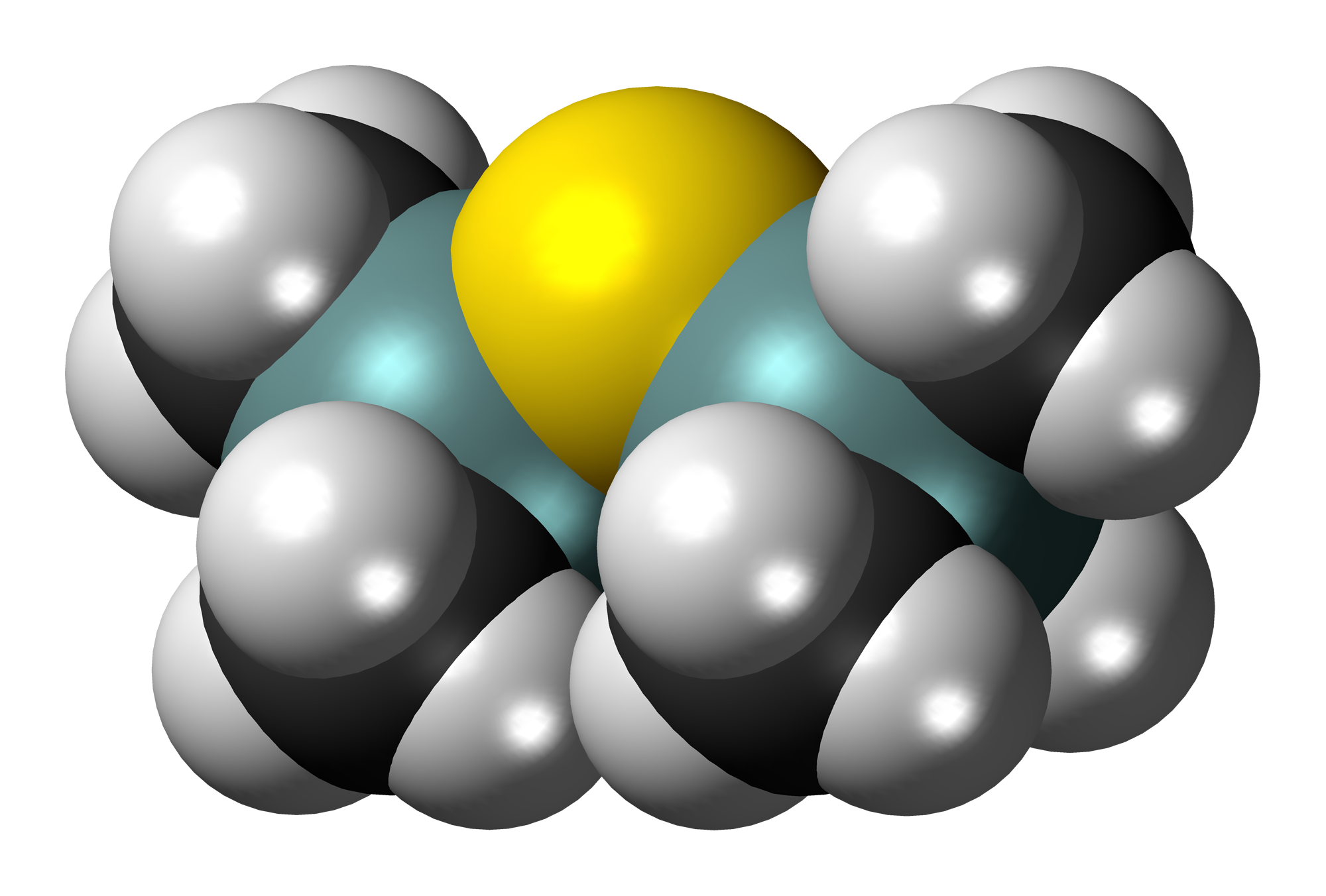

Names
- Preferred IUPAC name Hexamethyldisilathiane
- Other names Trimethyl[(trimethylsilyl)sulfanyl]silane

Identifiers
CAS Number	3385-94-2
3D model (JSmol)	Interactive image; Interactive image
Beilstein Reference	1698358
ChemSpider	69371
ECHA InfoCard	100.020.184
EC Number	222-201-4
PubChem CID	76920
UNII	AZ6L5QJY5H
UN number	1993
CompTox Dashboard (EPA)	DTXSID2063006
- InChI: InChI=1S/C6H18SSi2/c1-8(2,3)7-9(4,5)6/h1-6H3 Key: RLECCBFNWDXKPK-UHFFFAOYSA-N; InChI=1/C6H18SSi2/c1-8(2,3)7-9(4,5)6/h1-6H3 Key: RLECCBFNWDXKPK-UHFFFAOYAN
- SMILES: C[Si](C)(C)S[Si](C)(C)C; S([Si](C)(C)C)[Si](C)(C)C

Properties
Chemical formula	C_{6}H_{18}SSi_{2}
Molar mass	178.44 g·mol^{−1}
Appearance	colourless liquid with foul odor
Density	0.846 g cm^{−3}
Boiling point	163 °C (325 °F; 436 K)
Solubility in water	hydrolyzes
Solubility in other solvents	ethers such as THF and arenes such as toluene
Refractive index (n_{D})	1.4586

Structure
Dipole moment	1.85 D

Hazards
- Occupational safety and health (OHS/OSH)
Main hazards	Toxic
- GHS labelling
Pictograms	(GHS06: Toxic) (GHS02: Flammable)
Signal word	Danger
Hazard statements	H226, H301, H311, H331
Precautionary statements	P261, P280, P301+P310, P311
NFPA 704 (fire diamond)	2 3 0
Safety data sheet (SDS)	"External MSDS"

Related compounds
Related compounds	B_{2}S_{3}, SiS_{2}
- Except where otherwise noted, data are given for materials in their standard state (at 25 °C [77 °F], 100 kPa). verify (what is ?) Infobox references

Bis(trimethylsilyl) sulfide is the chemical compound with the formula ((CH_{3})_{3}Si)_{2}S. Often abbreviated (tms)_{2}S, this colourless, vile-smelling liquid is a useful aprotic source of "S^{2−}" in chemical synthesis.

== Synthesis ==
The reagent is prepared by treating trimethylsilyl chloride with anhydrous sodium sulfide:

2 (CH_{3})_{3}SiCl + Na_{2}S → ((CH_{3})_{3}Si)_{2}S + 2 NaCl

((CH_{3})_{3}Si)_{2}S must be protected from air because it hydrolyzes readily:

((CH_{3})_{3}Si)_{2}S + H_{2}O → ((CH_{3})_{3}Si)_{2}O + H_{2}S

== Use in synthesis ==
Bis(trimethylsilyl)sulfide is a reagent for the conversion of metal oxides and chlorides into the corresponding sulfides. This transformation exploits the affinity of silicon(IV) for oxygen and halides. An idealized reaction is:

((CH_{3})_{3}Si)_{2}S + MO → ((CH_{3})_{3}Si)_{2}O + MS

In a similar way, it has been used in the conversion of aldehydes and ketones to the corresponding thiones.

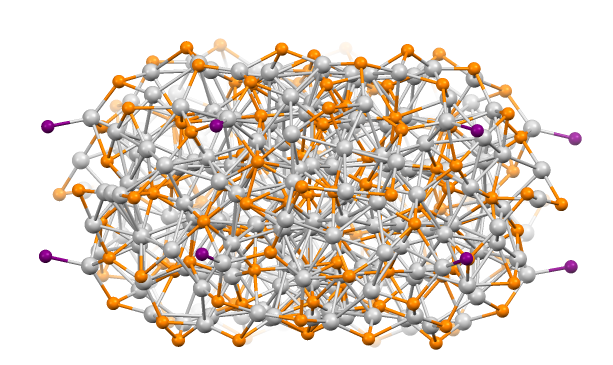
Large Ag-S cluster prepared with the use of bis(trimethylsilyl)sulfide.

== Safety ==
((CH_{3})_{3}Si)_{2}S reacts exothermically with water, releasing toxic H_{2}S.
