= Silicon disulfide =

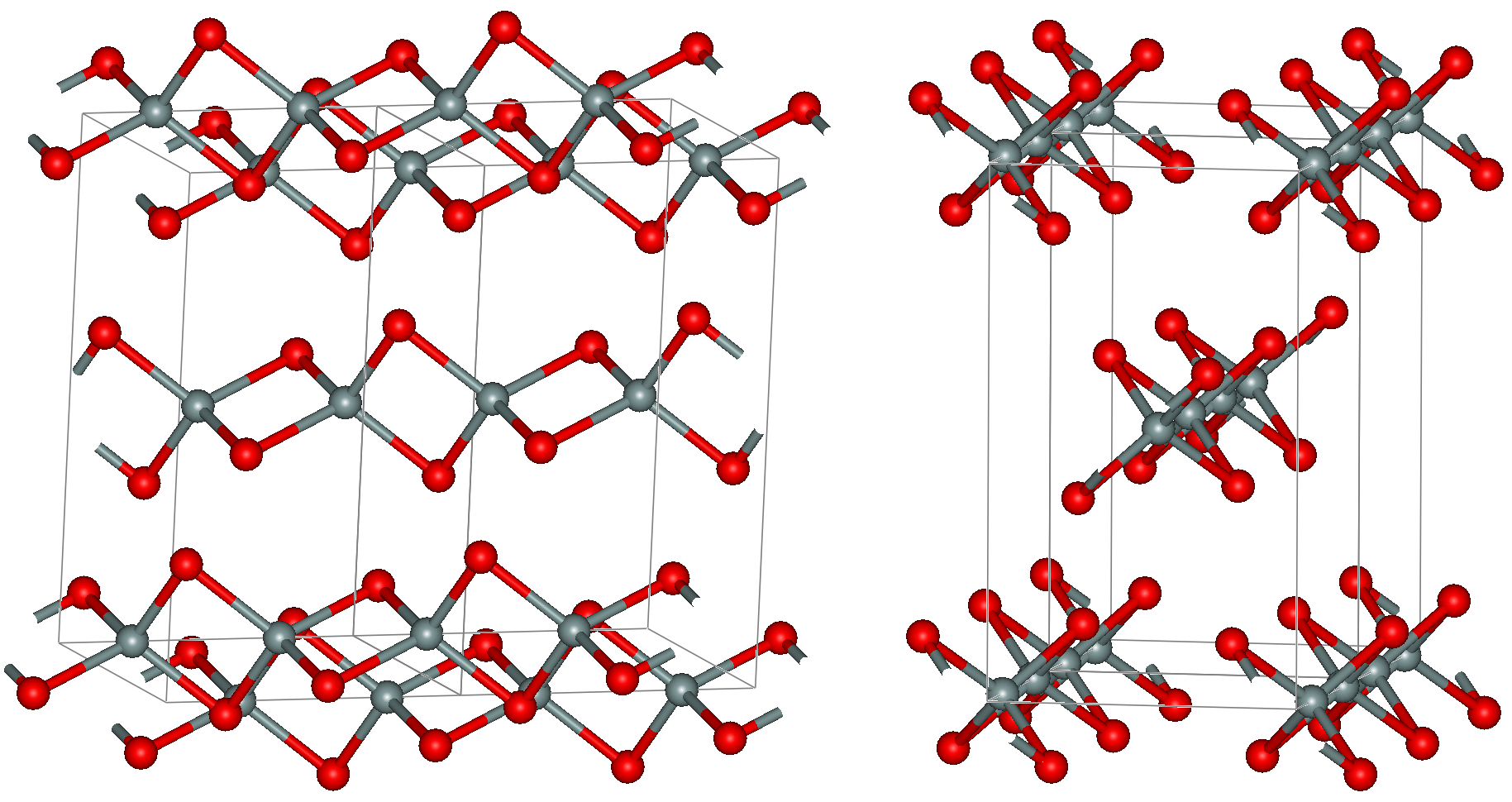

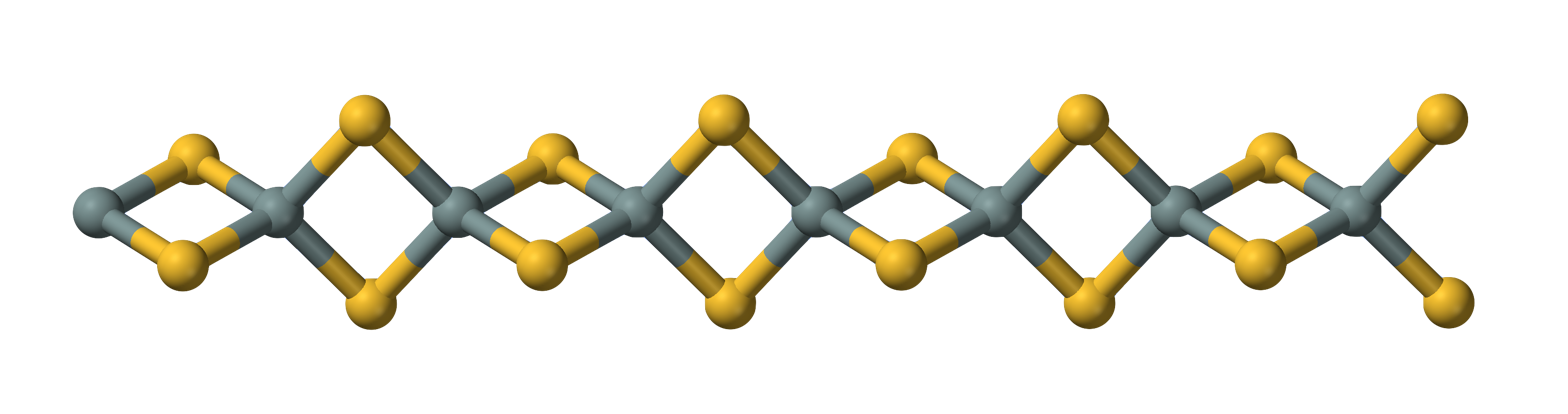

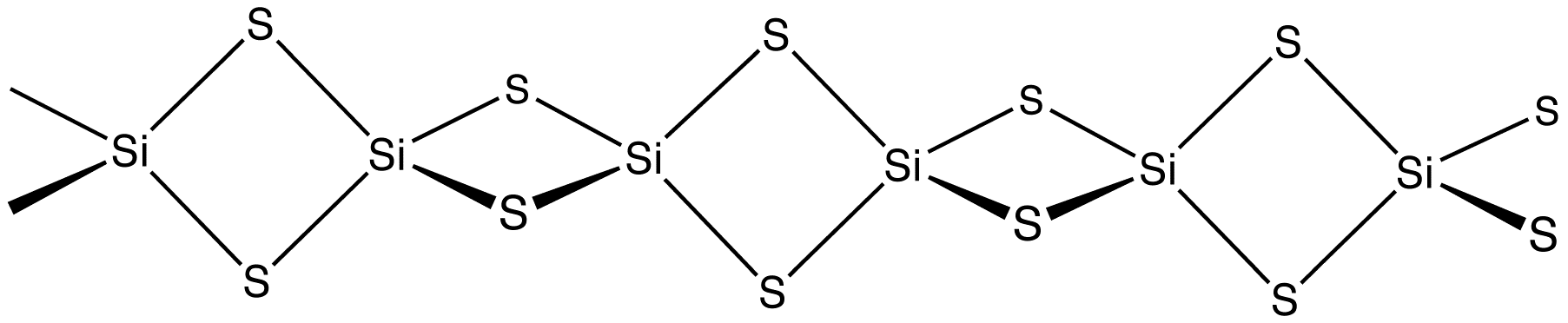

Names
- IUPAC name silicon(IV) sulfide
- Other names silicon disulfide

Identifiers
CAS Number	13759-10-9
3D model (JSmol)	monomer: Interactive image; polymer: Interactive image
ChemSpider	75527
ECHA InfoCard	100.033.935
PubChem CID	83705
UNII	35Y5PHW16K
CompTox Dashboard (EPA)	DTXSID4065606
- InChI: InChI=1S/S2Si/c1-3-2 Key: KHDSWONFYIAAPE-UHFFFAOYSA-N; InChI=1/S2Si/c1-3-2 Key: KHDSWONFYIAAPE-UHFFFAOYAO
- SMILES: monomer: S=[Si]=S; polymer: S=[Si](S0)S[Si]0(S0)S[Si]0(S0)S[Si]0(S0)S[Si]0(S0)S[Si]0(S0)S[Si]0=S

Properties
Chemical formula	SiS_{2}
Molar mass	92.218 g/mol
Appearance	White (samples are sometimes grey or brown) needles. Rotten egg smell in moist air.
Density	1.853 g/cm^{3}
Melting point	1,090 °C (1,990 °F; 1,360 K) sublimes
Solubility in water	Decomposes

Structure
Crystal structure	Orthorhombic, oI12
Space group	Ibam, No.72
Coordination geometry	Tetrahedral

Hazards
NFPA 704 (fire diamond)	2 2 3

Related compounds
Other anions	silicon dioxide
Other cations	carbon disulfide germanium disulfide tin(IV) sulfide lead(IV) sulfide
- Except where otherwise noted, data are given for materials in their standard state (at 25 °C [77 °F], 100 kPa). verify (what is ?) Infobox references

Silicon disulfide is the inorganic compound with the formula SiS_{2}. Like silicon dioxide, this material is polymeric, but it adopts a 1-dimensional structure quite different from the usual forms of SiO_{2}.

== Synthesis, structure, and properties ==
The material is formed by heating silicon and sulfur or by the exchange reaction between SiO_{2} and Al_{2}S_{3}. The material consists of chains of edge-shared tetrahedra, -Si(μ-S)_{2}Si(μ-S)_{2}-.

Like other silicon sulfur-compounds (e.g., bis(trimethylsilyl)sulfide) SiS_{2} hydrolyzes readily to release H_{2}S. In liquid ammonia it is reported to form the imide Si(NH)_{2} and NH_{4}SH, but a recent report has identified crystalline (NH_{4})_{2}[SiS_{3}(NH_{3})]·2NH_{3} as a product which contains the tetrahedral thiosilicate anion, SiS_{3}(NH_{3})^{2-}.

Reaction with ethanol gives the alkoxide tetraethyl orthosilicate and H_{2}S. With bulky tert-butanol, alcoholysis gives tris(tert-butoxy)silanethiol:

3 (CH_{3})_{3}COH + SiS_{2} → [(CH_{3})_{3}CO]_{3}SiSH + H_{2}S

Reaction with sodium sulfide, magnesium sulfide and aluminum sulfide give thiosilicates.

SiS_{2} is claimed to occur in certain interstellar objects.
