= Tris(tert-butoxy)silanethiol =

Partially condensed structural formula of tris(tert-butoxy)silanethiol
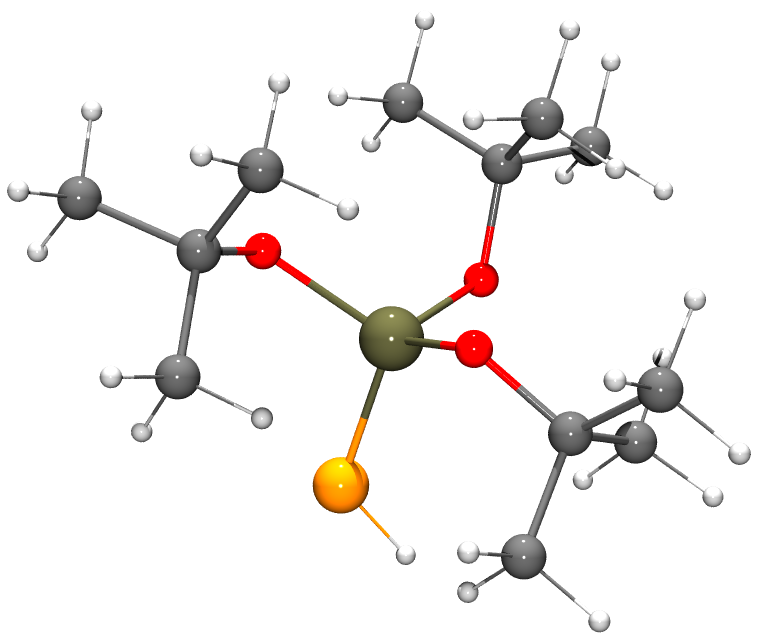
Ball and stick model of tris(tert-butoxy)silanethiol

Names
- Preferred IUPAC name Tri-tert-butoxysilanethiol
- Other names Tri(tert-butoxy)silanethiol

Identifiers
CAS Number	690-52-8
3D model (JSmol)	Interactive image
Abbreviations	TBST
ChemSpider	4414610
PubChem CID	5246420
CompTox Dashboard (EPA)	DTXSID50412972
- InChI: InChI=1S/C12H28O3SSi/c1-10(2,3)13-17(16,14-11(4,5)6)15-12(7,8)9/h16H,1-9H3 Key: ZVUGYOCGLCLJAV-UHFFFAOYSA-N
- SMILES: CC(C)(C)O[Si](S)(OC(C)(C)C)OC(C)(C)C

Properties
Chemical formula	C_{12}H_{28}O_{3}SSi
Molar mass	280.50 g·mol^{−1}
Appearance	Colourless liquid
Boiling point	113 to 115 °C (235 to 239 °F; 386 to 388 K) at 35 mmHg
- Except where otherwise noted, data are given for materials in their standard state (at 25 °C [77 °F], 100 kPa). Infobox references

Tris(tert-butoxy)silanethiol is a silicon compound containing three tert-butoxy groups and a rare Si–S–H functional group. This colourless compound serves as a hydrogen donor in radical chain reactions. It was first prepared by alcoholysis of silicon disulfide and purified by distillation:

3 (CH_{3})_{3}COH + SiS_{2} → [(CH_{3})_{3}CO]_{3}SiSH + H_{2}S

Since 1962 it was thoroughly studied including its acid-base properties and coordination chemistry with metal ions. It coordinates to metal ions via the sulfur and oxygen donor atoms.
