= Transition metal thiolate complex =

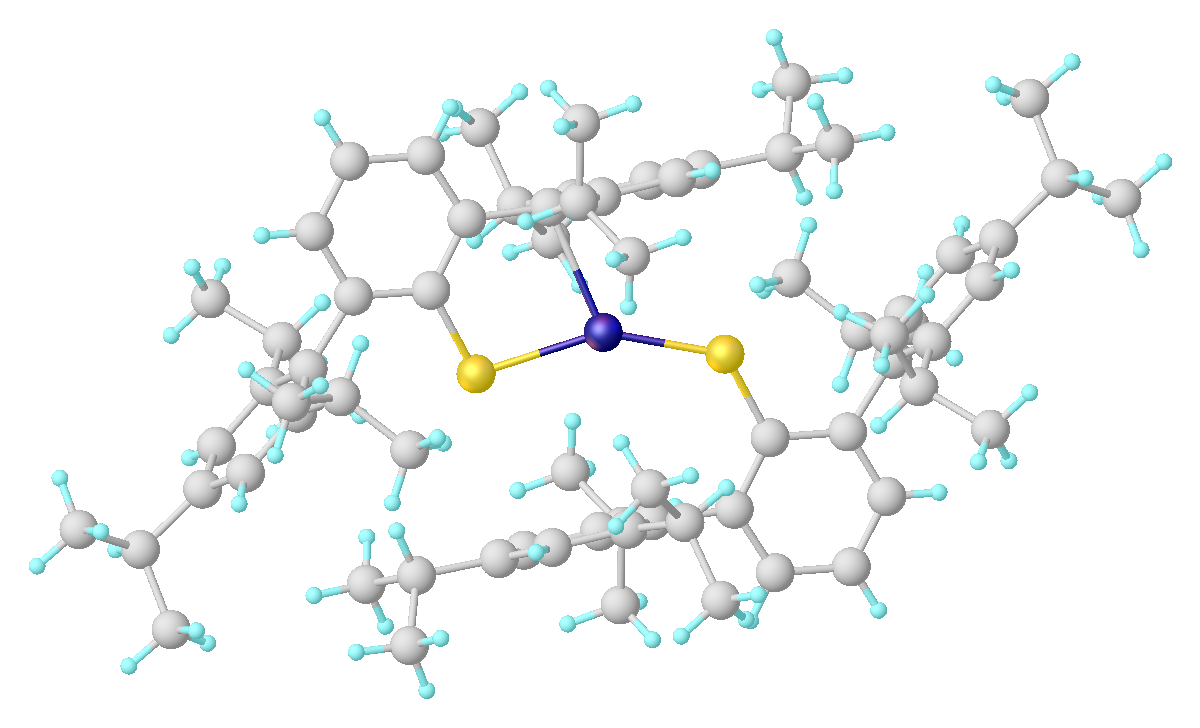
Structure of the quasi-two-coordinate ferrous dithiolate Fe[SC_{6}H_{3}-2,6-(C_{6}H_{2}-2,4,6-(^{i}Pr)_{3})_{2}]_{2}. A weak Fe–C(ipso) bond is indicated by the Fe–C distance of 2.427(1) Å. The structure illustrates the low coordination numbers enabled by bulky ligands.

Transition metal thiolate complexes are metal complexes containing thiolate ligands. Thiolates are ligands that can be classified as soft Lewis bases. Therefore, thiolate ligands coordinate most strongly to metals that behave as soft Lewis acids as opposed to those that behave as hard Lewis acids. Most complexes contain other ligands in addition to thiolate, but many homoleptic complexes are known with only thiolate ligands. The amino acid cysteine has a thiol functional group, consequently many cofactors in proteins and enzymes feature cysteinate-metal cofactors.

== Thiolate as a ligand ==
Thiolate is classified as an X ligand in the Covalent bond classification method. In the usual electron counting method, it is a one-electron ligand when terminal and a three-electron ligand when doubly bridging. From the electric structure perspective, thiolate is a pi-donor ligand, akin to alkoxide. One consequence is that few polythiolate complexes are low spin. Another consequence is that electron-precise thiolate complexes tend to be rather nucleophilic. From the perspective of HSAB theory, thiolates are soft. Late metal thiolates are water stable but early metal thiolates tend to hydrolyze. For example, Mo(^{t}BuS)_{4}, a dark red diamagnetic solid, is sensitive to oxygen and moisture.

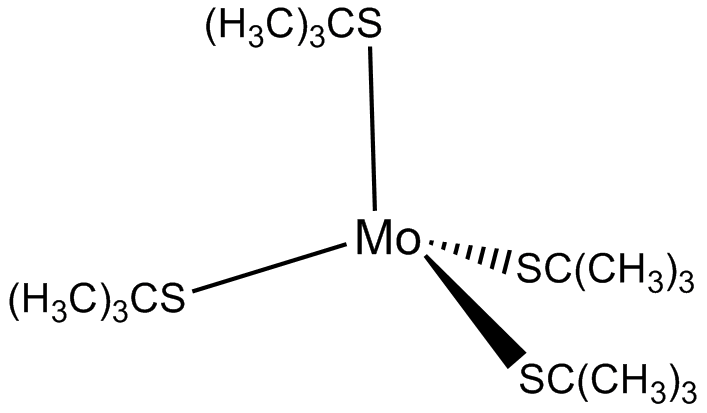
Mo(^{t}BuS)_{4}.

Monothiolate ligands range from simple, nonbulky methanethiolate (CH_{3}S^{−}) to very bulky arylthiolates. Many dithiolate ligands are known, starting with the conjugate bases of 1,2-ethanedithiol and 1,3-propanedithiol. Unsaturated versions of 1,2-dithiolates usually take the form of dithiolene ligands, the parent member being (HC)_{2}S^{2−}_{2}.

== Synthesis ==
Metal thiolate complexes are commonly prepared by reactions of metal complexes with thiols (RSH), thiolates (RS^{−}), and disulfides (R_{2}S_{2}). The salt metathesis reaction route is common. In this method, an alkali metal thiolate is treated with a transition metal halide to produce an alkali metal halide and the metal thiolate complex. For example, lithium tert-butylthiolate reacts with MoCl_{4} to give the tetrathiolate complex:

MoCl_{4} + 4 ^{t}BuSLi → Mo(^{t}BuS)_{4} + 4 LiCl

Nickelocene and ethanethiol react to give a dimeric thiolate, one cyclopentadienyl ligand serving as a base:

2 HSC_{2}H_{5} + 2 Ni(C_{5}H_{5})_{2} → [Ni(SC_{2}H_{5})(C_{5}H_{5})]_{2} + 2 C_{5}H_{6}

Regarding their mechanism of formation from thiols, metal thiolate complexes can arise via deprotonation of thiol complexes.

=== Redox routes ===
Structure of Fe_{2}(SCH_{3})_{2}(CO)_{6}.

Many thiolate complexes are prepared by redox reactions. Organic disulfides oxidize low valence metals, as illustrated by the oxidation of titanocene dicarbonyl:

(C_{5}H_{5})_{2}Ti(CO)_{2} + (C_{6}H_{5}S)_{2} → (C_{5}H_{5})_{2}Ti(SC_{6}H_{5})_{2} + 2 CO

Some metal centers are oxidized by thiols, the coproduct being hydrogen gas:

Fe_{3}(CO)_{12} + 2 C_{2}H_{5}SH → Fe_{2}(SC_{2}H_{5})_{2}(CO)_{6} + Fe(CO)_{5} + CO + H_{2}

These reactions may proceed by the oxidative addition of the thiol to Fe(0).

Thiols and especially thiolate salts are reducing agents. Consequently, they induce redox reactions with certain transition metals. This phenomenon is illustrated by the synthesis of cuprous thiolates from cupric precursors:

4 HSC_{6}H_{5} + 2 CuO → 2 Cu(SC_{6}H_{5}) + (C_{6}H_{5}S)_{2} + 2 H_{2}O

Thiolate clusters of the type [Fe_{4}S_{4}(SR)_{4}]^{2−} occur in iron–sulfur proteins. Synthetic analogues can be prepared by combined redox and salt metathesis reactions:

4 FeCl_{3} + 6 NaSR + 6 NaSH → Na_{2}[Fe_{4}S_{4}(SR)_{4}] + 10 NaCl + 4 HCl + H_{2}S + R_{2}S_{2}

== Reactions ==
Thiolates are relatively basic ligands, being derived from conjugate acids with pK_{a} of 6.5 (thiophenol) to 10.5 (butanethiol). Consequently, thiolate ligand often bridge pairs of metals. One example is Fe_{2}(SCH_{3})_{2}(CO)_{6}. Thiolate ligands, especially when nonbridging, are susceptible to attack by electrophiles including acids, alkylating agents, and oxidants.

Electron-rich thiolate complexes are susceptible to hydride abstration giving complexes of thioaldehyde:

Cp·Re(NO)(PPh_{3})SCH_{2}Ph) + Ph_{3}C^{+} → Cp·Re(NO)(PPh_{3})(SCHPh)]^{+} + Ph_{3}CH (Ph = phenyl)

== Occurrence and applications ==
Metal thiolates in bioinorganic chemistry

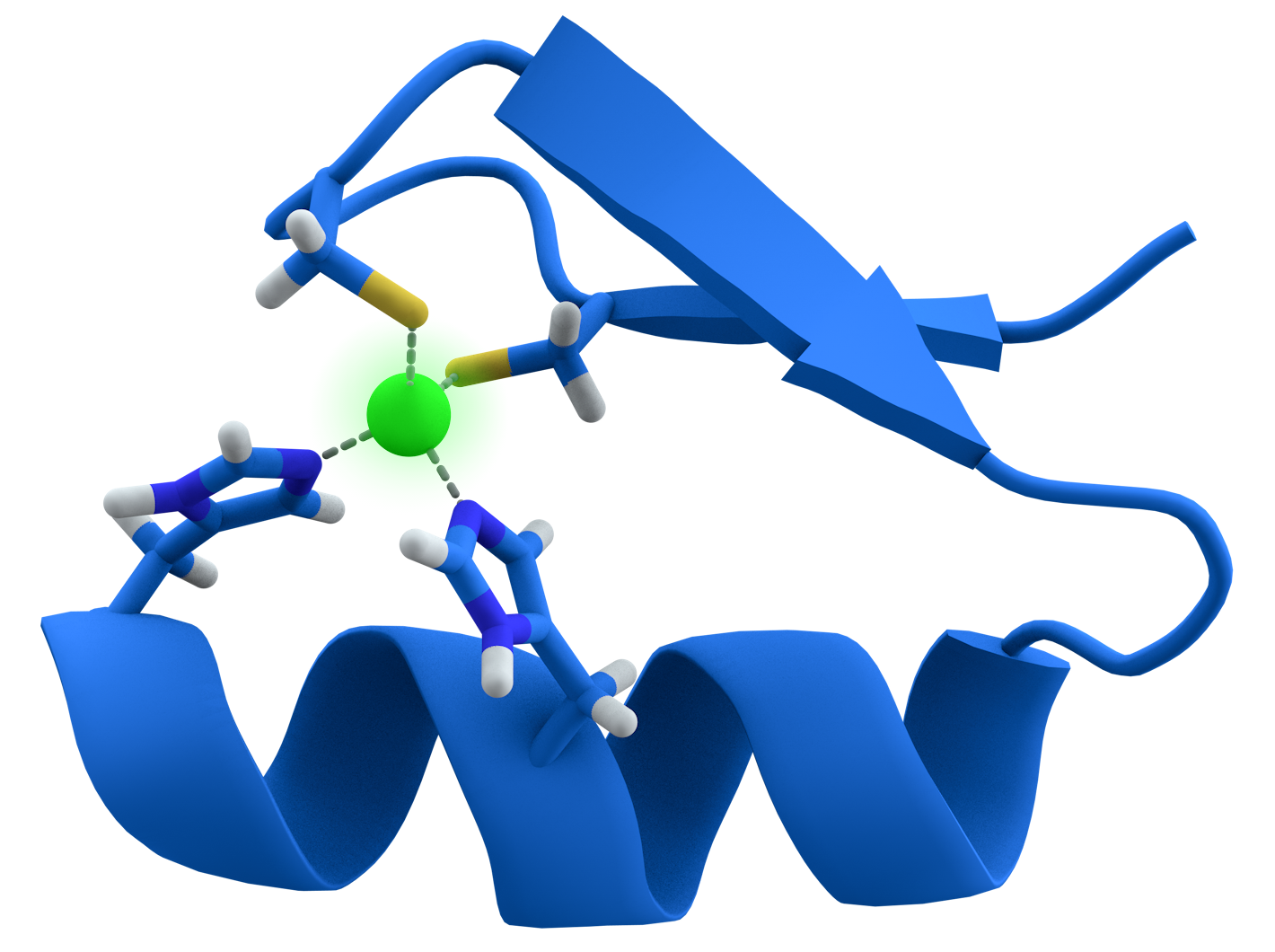
The zinc finger motif, which is found in transcription factors.

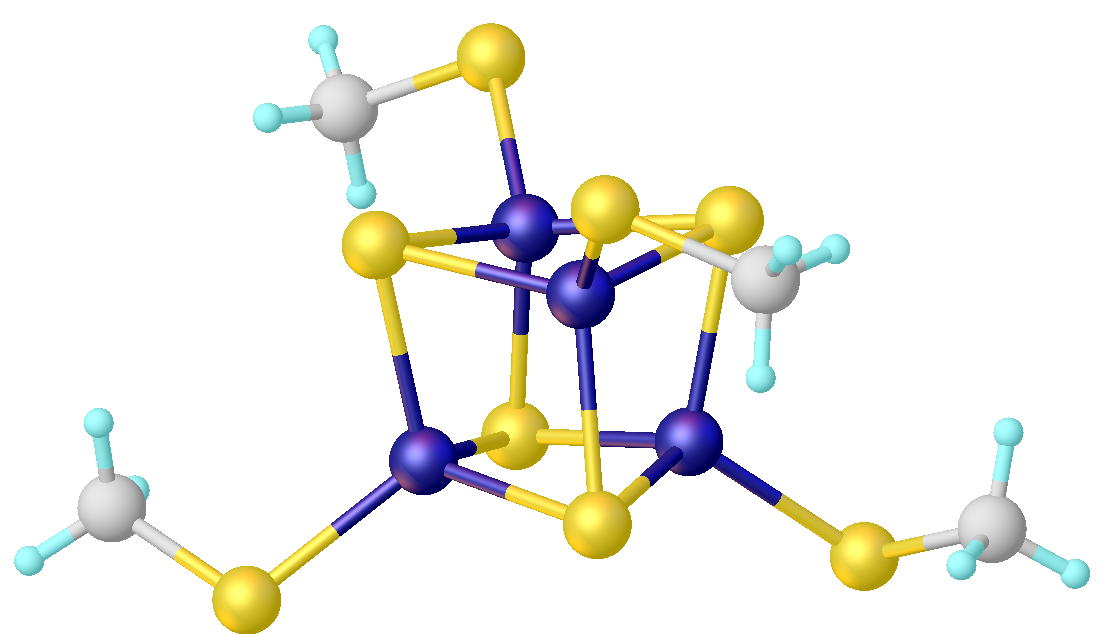
Structure of [Fe_{4}S_{4}(SMe)_{4}]^{2−}, a synthetic analogue of 4Fe–4S cofactors.

Thiomersal, a disinfectant, is a metal thiolate complex containing Hg(II)

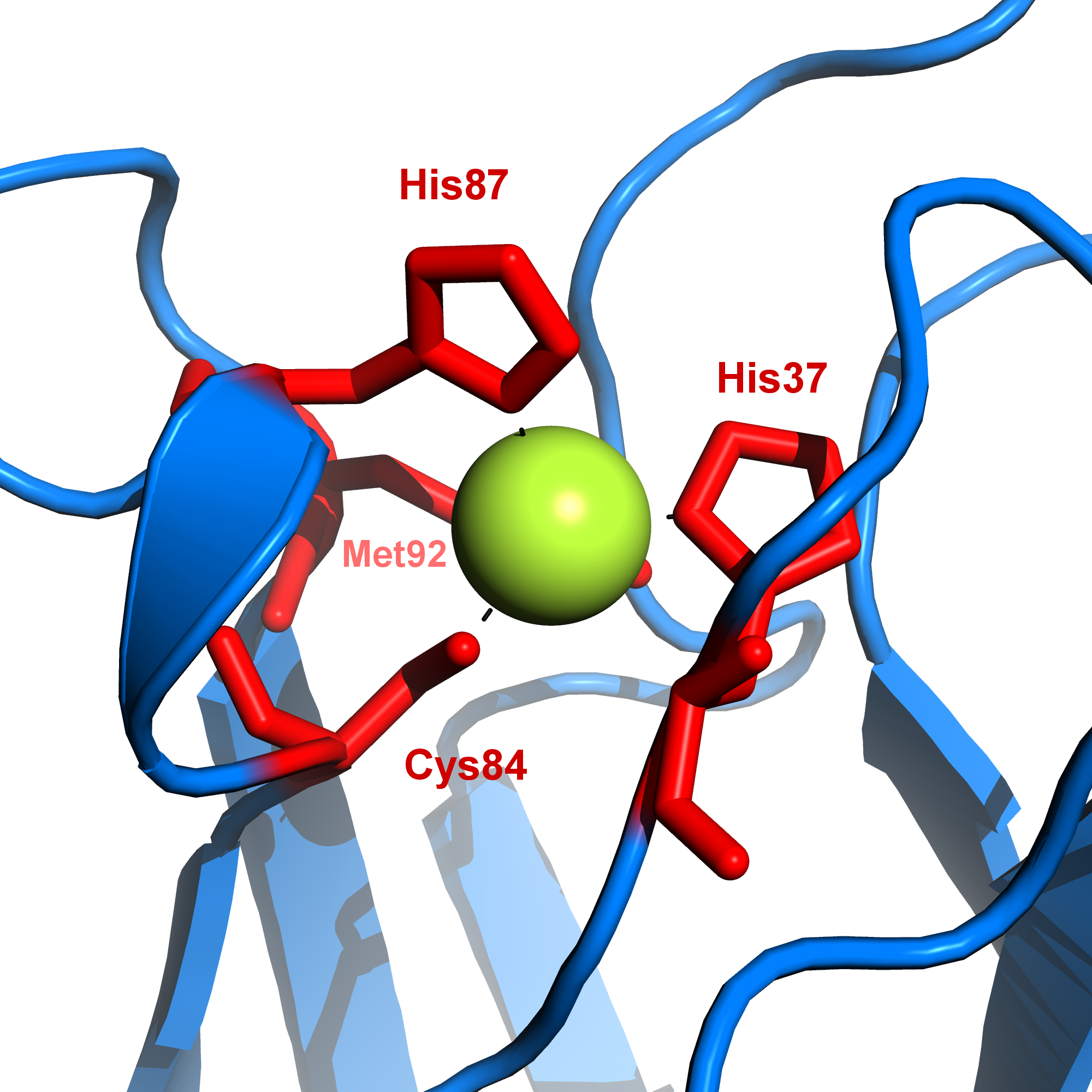
The copper site in plastocyanin features two imidazole, a thioether, and a thiolate

Metal thiolate functionality, almost always provided by the cysteine residue, is pervasive in metalloenzymes. Iron-sulfur proteins, blue copper proteins, and the zinc-containing enzyme liver alcohol dehydrogenase feature thiolate ligands. The pi-donor property of thiolate ligands stabilizes Fe(IV) states in the enzyme cytochrome P450. All molybdoproteins feature thiolates in the form of cysteinyl and/or molybdopterin. Metallothionins are cysteine-rich proteins that bind heavy metals.
