= Boron sulfides =

Class of chemical compounds

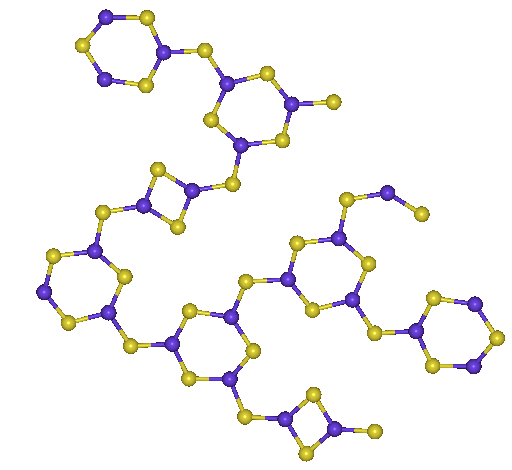
Structure of a part of the B_{2}S_{3} sheets. Color code: yellow = S, blue = B.

In chemistry, boron sulfides refer to a large family of compounds characterized by boron-sulfur bonds. These compounds are colorless solids prone to hydrolysis, a process that reflects their tendency to form boron oxides. In terms of structure, boron typically exhibits an oxidation state of +3, while sulfur exhibits an oxidation state of -2. Sulfide is typically two-coordinate and boron is three coordinate.

== Binary boron sulfides ==
Structure of one form of BS_{2}

The parent boron sulfide is B_{2}S_{3}. According to X-ray crystallography, this material is polymeric, with 3-coordinate B and 2-coordinate S. It features both four- and six-membered rings. Two sulfur-rich phases are also known, polymeric (BS_{2})_{n} and molecular (BS_{2})_{8}. The latter two feature some S-S bonds.

== Tertiary phases ==
From a structural perspective, the simplest members are derivatives of trigonal planar [BS_{3}]^{3−}, exemplified by Li_{3}BS_{3}. Other motifs include the following anions: [B_{2}S_{4}]^{2−} and [B_{3}S_{6}]^{3−}, which also exist as alkali metal salts.
