= Methylthioirontricarbonyl dimer =

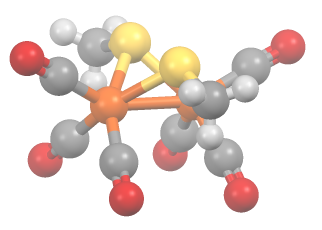

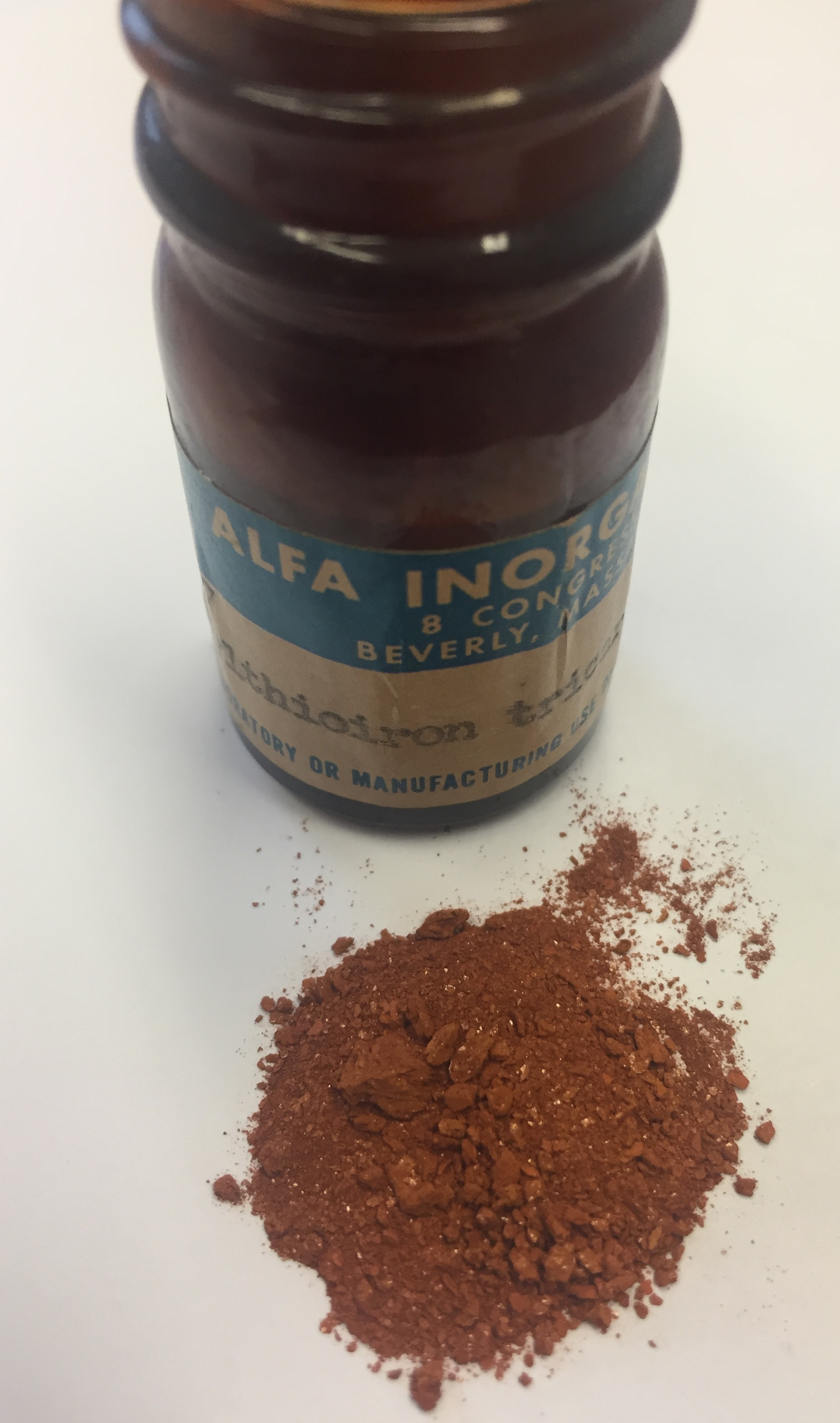

Names
- Other names Methanethiolatoirontricarbonyl dimer

Identifiers
CAS Number	14878-96-7
3D model (JSmol)	Interactive image
ECHA InfoCard	100.035.396
EC Number	238-952-6
PubChem CID	6398988
- InChI: InChI=1S/6CO.2CH4S.2Fe/c8*1-2;;/h;;;;;;2*2H,1H3;;/p-2 Key: SPTHAIYODQFJDT-UHFFFAOYSA-L
- SMILES: O=C=[Fe](=C=O)(=C=O)12S(C)[Fe]1(=C=O)(=C=O)(=C=O)S2C

Properties
Chemical formula	C_{8}H_{6}Fe_{2}O_{6}S_{2}
Molar mass	373.94 g/mol
Appearance	red crystals
Melting point	65 °C (149 °F; 338 K) (isomer A), 102 °C (isomer B)
- Except where otherwise noted, data are given for materials in their standard state (at 25 °C [77 °F], 100 kPa). Infobox references

Methylthioirontricarbonyl dimer, also known as methanethiolatoirontricarbonyl dimer, is an organometallic compound with the formula Fe_{2}(SCH_{3})_{2}(CO)_{6}. It is a red volatile solid that is classified as a transition metal thiolate complex. It exists as air-stable red crystals with two isomers, where the methyl groups are either anti (isomer A) or syn (isomer B) with respect to each other.

== Synthesis ==
It was first synthesized 1940 with the discovery of isomers in 1962. Synthesis involves treating triiron dodecacarbonyl with dimethyl disulfide:

2 Fe_{3}(CO)_{12} + 3 (CH_{3})_{2}S_{2} → 3 [Fe(CO)_{3}SCH_{3}]_{2} + 6 CO

It can be purified by recrystallization or by sublimation. The isomers can be separated by chromatography.

== Structure ==
The methylthioirontricarbonyl dimer is a butterfly cluster compound, consisting of two iron atoms with distorted square pyramidal coordination geometry. The geometry is octahedral if the Fe-Fe bond is included. Each iron has three terminal carbon monoxide ligands and two bridging methylthiolate ligands. The Fe-Fe distance is 2.537 Å with an average Fe-S bond length of 2.259 Å. The average Fe-S-Fe bond angle is relatively small at 68.33°. Three isomers are possible but only the diequatorial and axial-equatorial isomers are seen. The diaxial isomer is disfavored due to steric hindrance. The structurally related compound [Fe(CO)_{3}S]_{2} has idealized C_{2v} symmetry.
