= Thioformaldehyde =

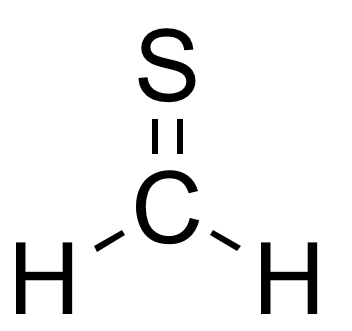

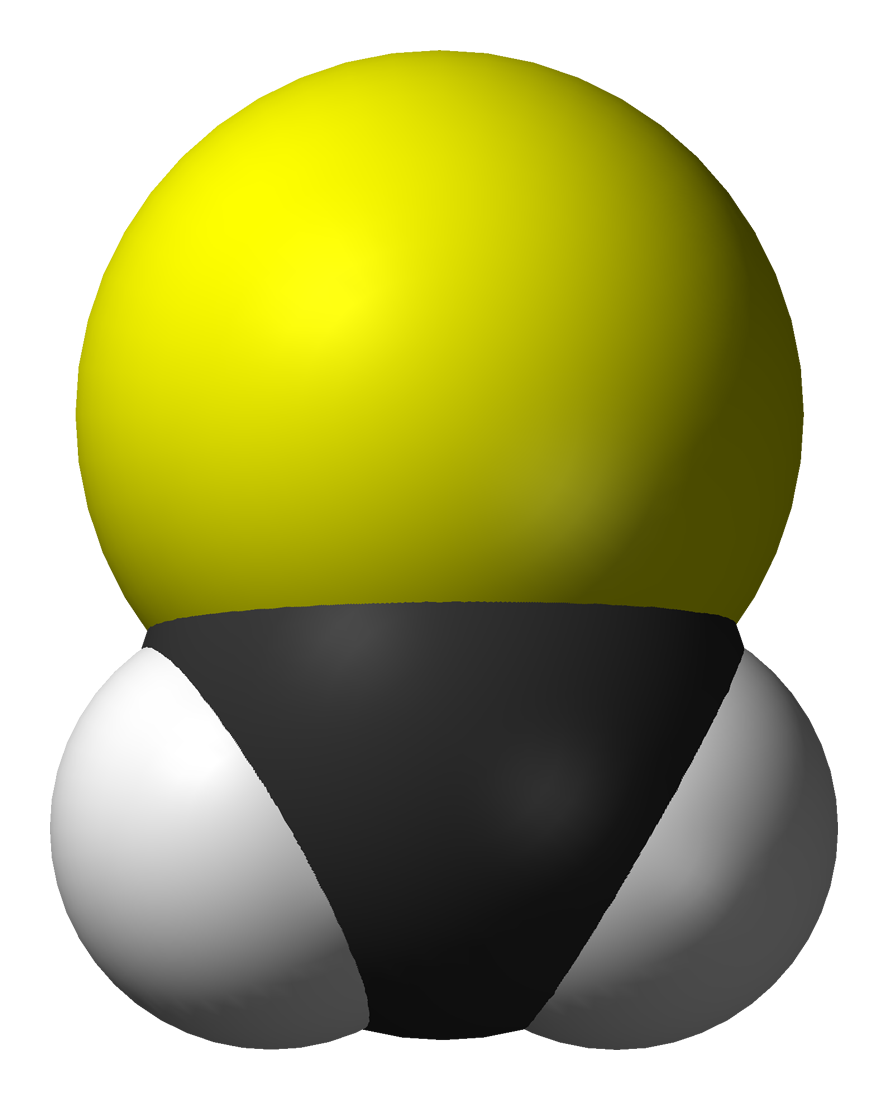

Names
- IUPAC name Thioformaldehyde
- Systematic IUPAC name Methanethial

Identifiers
CAS Number	865-36-1
3D model (JSmol)	Interactive image
ChemSpider	71446
EC Number	200-454-1
PubChem CID	79115
CompTox Dashboard (EPA)	DTXSID901336564 DTXSID70952941, DTXSID901336564
- InChI: InChI=1S/CH2S/c1-2/h1H2 Key: DBTDEFJAFBUGPP-UHFFFAOYSA-N
- SMILES: C=S

Properties
Chemical formula	CH_{2}S
Molar mass	46.09 g·mol^{−1}
Appearance	unknown
- Except where otherwise noted, data are given for materials in their standard state (at 25 °C [77 °F], 100 kPa). Infobox references

Thioformaldehyde is the organosulfur compound with the formula CH_{2}S. It is the simplest thioaldehyde. This compound is not observed in the condensed state (solid or liquid) because it oligomerizes to 1,3,5-trithiane, which is a stable colorless compound with the same empirical formula.

Despite the instability of these concentrated forms, thioformaldehyde as a dilute gas has been extensively studied. For these purposes, it is produced by thermal decomposition of dimethyl disulfide. The molecule has been observed in the interstellar medium and has attracted much attention for its fundamental nature. The tendency of thioformaldehyde to form chains and rings is a manifestation of the double bond rule.

Although thioformaldehyde tends to oligomerize, many metal complexes are known.
