= Trithiolane =

- structure of 1,2,3- and 1,2,4-trithiolane

Identifiers
CAS Number	1,2,3: 6669–39–2; 1,2,4: 289–16–7
3D model (JSmol)	1,2,3: Interactive image; 1,2,4: Interactive image
ChEBI	1,2,4: CHEBI:192387
ChemSpider	1,2,3: 504147; 1,2,4: 8901
PubChem CID	1,2,3: 579992; 1,2,4: 9258
UNII	1,2,4: OF568IX8QZ
CompTox Dashboard (EPA)	1,2,3: DTXSID90342229; 1,2,4: DTXSID70183091
- InChI: 1,2,3: InChI=1S/C2H4S3/c1-2-4-5-3-1/h1-2H2 Key: LTTGPXZEANXUSL-UHFFFAOYSA-N; 1,2,4: InChI=1S/C2H4S3/c1-3-2-5-4-1/h1-2H2 Key: QHGFEUAAQKJXDI-UHFFFAOYSA-N
- SMILES: 1,2,3: C1CSSS1; 1,2,4: C1SCSS1

Properties
Chemical formula	C_{2}H_{4}S_{3}
Molar mass	124.23 g·mol^{−1}

Related compounds
Related compounds	Dithiolane
- Except where otherwise noted, data are given for materials in their standard state (at 25 °C [77 °F], 100 kPa). Infobox references

In the area of organosulfur chemistry, trithiolane refers to either of two families of heterocycles with the C_{2}S_{3} rings:

- 1,2,3-trithiolanes with a C-C bond

parent: 1,2,3-trithiolane (registry number 6669–39–2), colorless liquid, boiling point = 224 °C

- 1,2,4-trithiolanes with only one S-S bond

parent: 1,2,4-trithiolane (registry number 289–16–7), colorless solid, melting point 74-75 °C

== Occurrence ==
A 1,2,3-trithiolane arises from treating of norbornene with elemental sulfur. The same reaction also gives the pentasulfide (pentathiepane).

1,2,4-Trithiolanes are volatile components of many foods, especially after cooking. The frying of chicken produces 3,5-dimethyl-, 3,5-diisobutyl-1,2,4-trithiolane, 3-methyl-5-butyl-, and 3-methyl-5-pentyl-1,2,4-trithiolanes. Trithiolane itself contributes to the flavor of truffles. 3,5-Dimethyltrithiolane is a component of the intense odor of durian.

1,2,4-Trithiolanes can be made artificially from partial oxidation of a thiocarbonyl to the thiosulfine, and then dimerization. In such cases the ring adduct is in quilibrium with the reagents, and so slowly decomposes back to thiocarbonyls and elemental sulfur.
