= Carter–Goddard–Malrieu–Trinquier model =

The Carter–Goddard–Malrieu–Trinquier model (better known as CGMT model) is a model in inorganic chemistry, used for the description and prediction of distortions in multiple bonding systems of main group elements.

== Theory ==
The model predicts that if the double bond is homolytically cleaved in a system R^{1} R^{2} M = MR^{3} R^{4}, the two carbene analog fragments resulting therefrom can subsequently be present in both a singlet and a triplet state. Independently, however, the basic state of the fragments may be a triplet or a singlet state. EA Carter and WA Goddard III showed that the binding energy E_{G} results from the bond dissociation energy E _{int} minus the sum of the singlet-triplet excitation energies ΣΔE S → T of the resulting fragments. E _{GBE} = E _{int} - ΣΔE _{S → T}.

This model was extended by G. Trinquier and J. P. Malrieu by the possibility to make statements about the geometry (characterized by the distance between the metal centers r, and the tilt angle θ) of a double bond system due to ΣΔE _{S → T}. As can be seen in the illustration, a coplanar structure (θ = 0 °) is optimal for triplet fragments. For singlet fragments, however, there is a double donor-acceptor bond with an angle of θ close to 45 °.
