= Thial =

Chemical group (–CH=S)

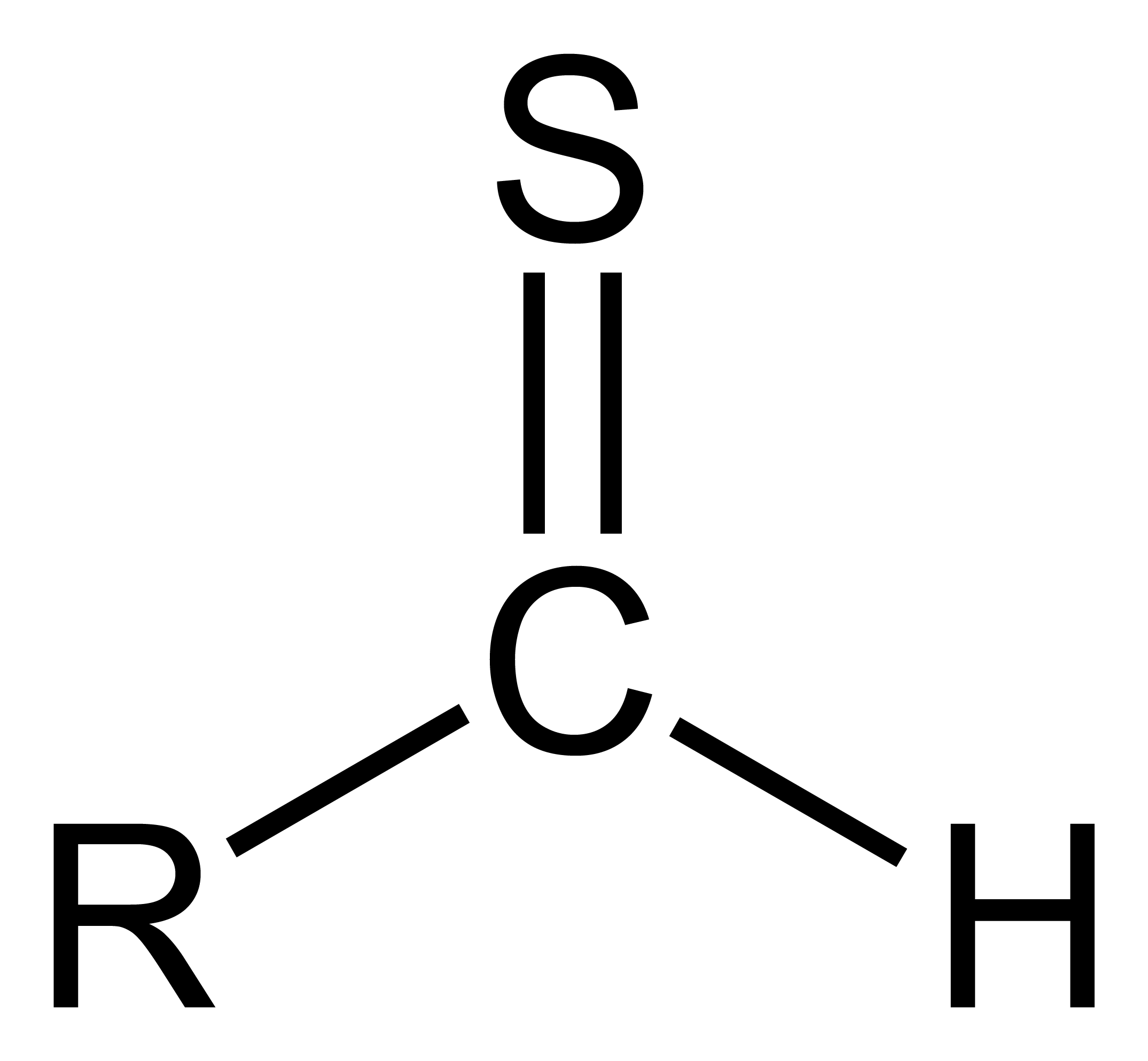
Chemical structure of a thial

In organic chemistry, a thial or thioaldehyde is a functional group which is similar to an aldehyde, RC(O)H, in which a sulfur (S) atom replaces the oxygen (O) atom of the aldehyde (R represents an alkyl or aryl group). Thioaldehydes are even more reactive than thioketones. Unhindered thioaldehydes are generally too reactive to be isolated — for example, thioformaldehyde, H_{2}C=S, condenses to the cyclic trimer 1,3,5-trithiane. Thioacrolein, H_{2}C=CHCH=S, formed by decomposition of allicin from garlic, undergoes a self Diels-Alder reaction giving isomeric vinyldithiins. While thioformaldehyde is highly reactive, it is found in interstellar space along with its mono- and di-deuterated isotopologues. With sufficient steric bulk, however, stable thioaldehydes can be isolated.

Thioacetaldehyde (CH_{3}CHS) has been detected in the Taurus Molecular Cloud.

In early work, the existence of thioaldehydes was inferred by trapping processes. For instance the reaction of Fc_{2}P_{2}S_{4} with benzaldehyde was proposed to form thiobenzaldehyde, which forms a cycloadduct with the dithiophosphine ylides to form a C_{2}PS_{3} ring.

== See also ==
- Thioketone
- Thioenol
- Organosulfur compounds
