= Thiobenzophenone =

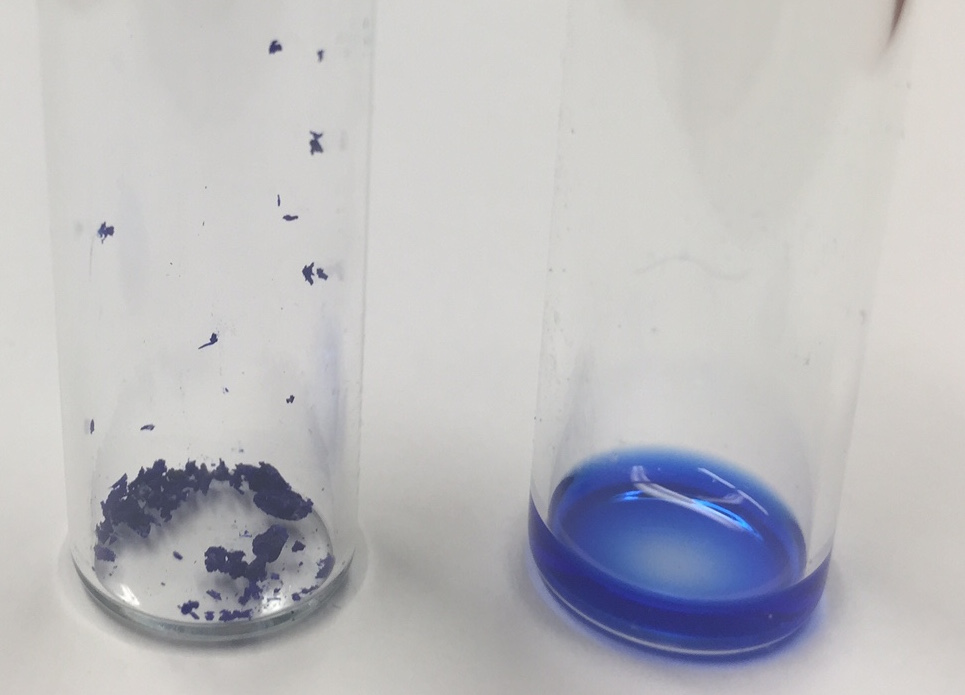

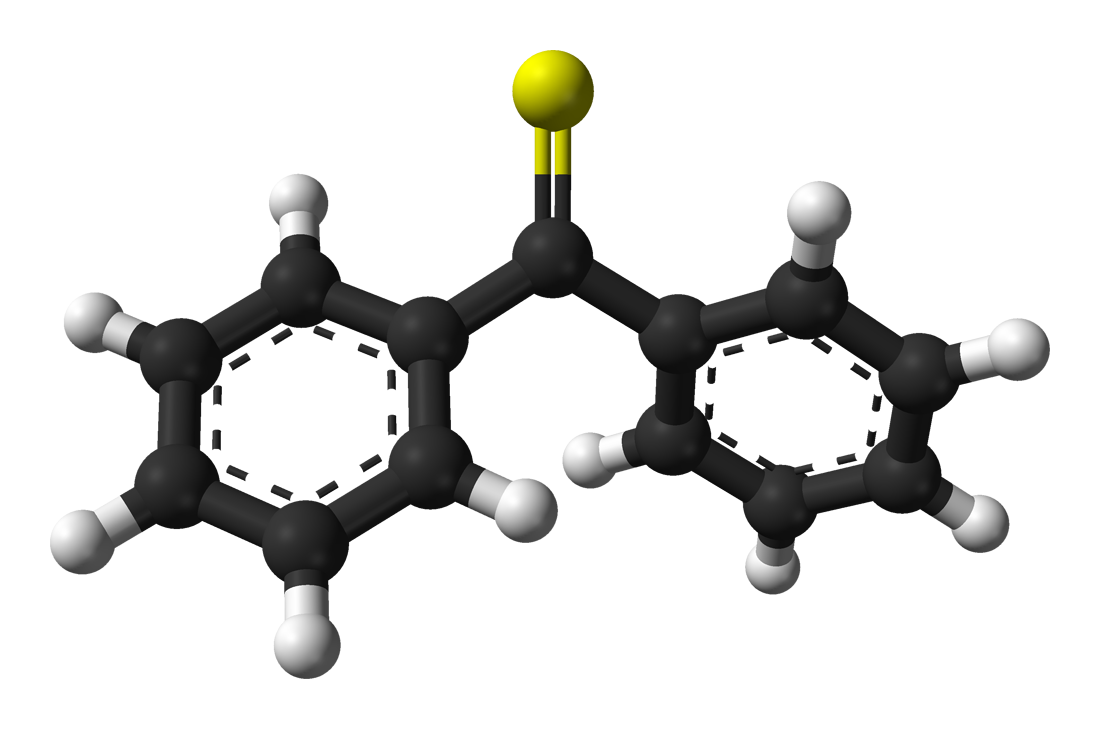

Names
- Preferred IUPAC name Diphenylmethanethione

Identifiers
CAS Number	1450-31-3
3D model (JSmol)	Interactive image
ChemSpider	502886
PubChem CID	578536
UNII	JYQ6P4G3UJ
CompTox Dashboard (EPA)	DTXSID50342088
- InChI: InChI=1S/C13H10S/c14-13(11-7-3-1-4-8-11)12-9-5-2-6-10-12/h1-10H Key: XDDVRYDDMGRFAZ-UHFFFAOYSA-N; InChI=1/C13H10S/c14-13(11-7-3-1-4-8-11)12-9-5-2-6-10-12/h1-10H Key: XDDVRYDDMGRFAZ-UHFFFAOYAD
- SMILES: S=C(C1=CC=CC=C1)C2=CC=CC=C2

Properties
Chemical formula	C_{13}H_{10}S
Molar mass	198.28 g·mol^{−1}
Appearance	Deep blue solid
Melting point	53 to 54 °C (127 to 129 °F; 326 to 327 K)
Boiling point	174 °C (345 °F; 447 K)

Hazards
Flash point	no
- Except where otherwise noted, data are given for materials in their standard state (at 25 °C [77 °F], 100 kPa). verify (what is ?) Infobox references

Thiobenzophenone is an organosulfur compound with the formula (C_{6}H_{5})_{2}CS. It is the prototypical thioketone. Unlike other thioketones that tend to dimerize to form rings and polymers, thiobenzophenone is quite stable, although it photoxidizes in air back to benzophenone and sulfur. Thiobenzophenone is deep blue and dissolves readily in many organic solvents.

== Structure ==
The C=S bond length of thiobenzophenone is 1.63 Å, which is comparable to 1.64 Å, the C=S bond length of thioformaldehyde, measured in the gas phase. Due to steric interactions, the phenyl groups are not coplanar and the dihedral angle SC-CC is 36°. A variety of thiones with structures and stability related to thiobenzophenone have also been prepared.

== Synthesis ==
One of the first reported syntheses of thiobenzophenone involves the reaction of sodium hydrosulfide and diphenyldichloromethane:

Ph_{2}CCl_{2} + 2 NaSH → Ph_{2}C=S + 2 NaCl + H_{2}S

An updated method involves sulfiding of benzophenone:

Ph_{2}C=O + H_{2}S → Ph_{2}C=S + H_{2}O

In the above reaction scheme, a mixture of gaseous hydrogen chloride and hydrogen sulfide are passed into a cooled solution of benzophenone in ethanol. Thiobenzophenone can also be produced by a Friedel-Crafts reaction of thiobenzoyl chloride and benzene.

== Reactivity ==
Due to the relative weakness of the C=S bond, thiobenzophenone is more reactive than benzophenone. Thiobenzophenone (as well as other thioketones) is a dipolarophiles and dienophiles. For example, it combines with 1,3-dienes in Diels-Alder cycloadditions. The rate of thioketones in cycloadditions is related but not limited to the size of the small HOMO/LUMO energy gap of the π-MOs of the C=S double bond. Reactions between thiobenzophenone and most dienes yield Diels-Alder adducts whereas reactions with monoolefins yield bicyclic compounds.
