= Thioketone =

Organic compounds with the structure >C=S

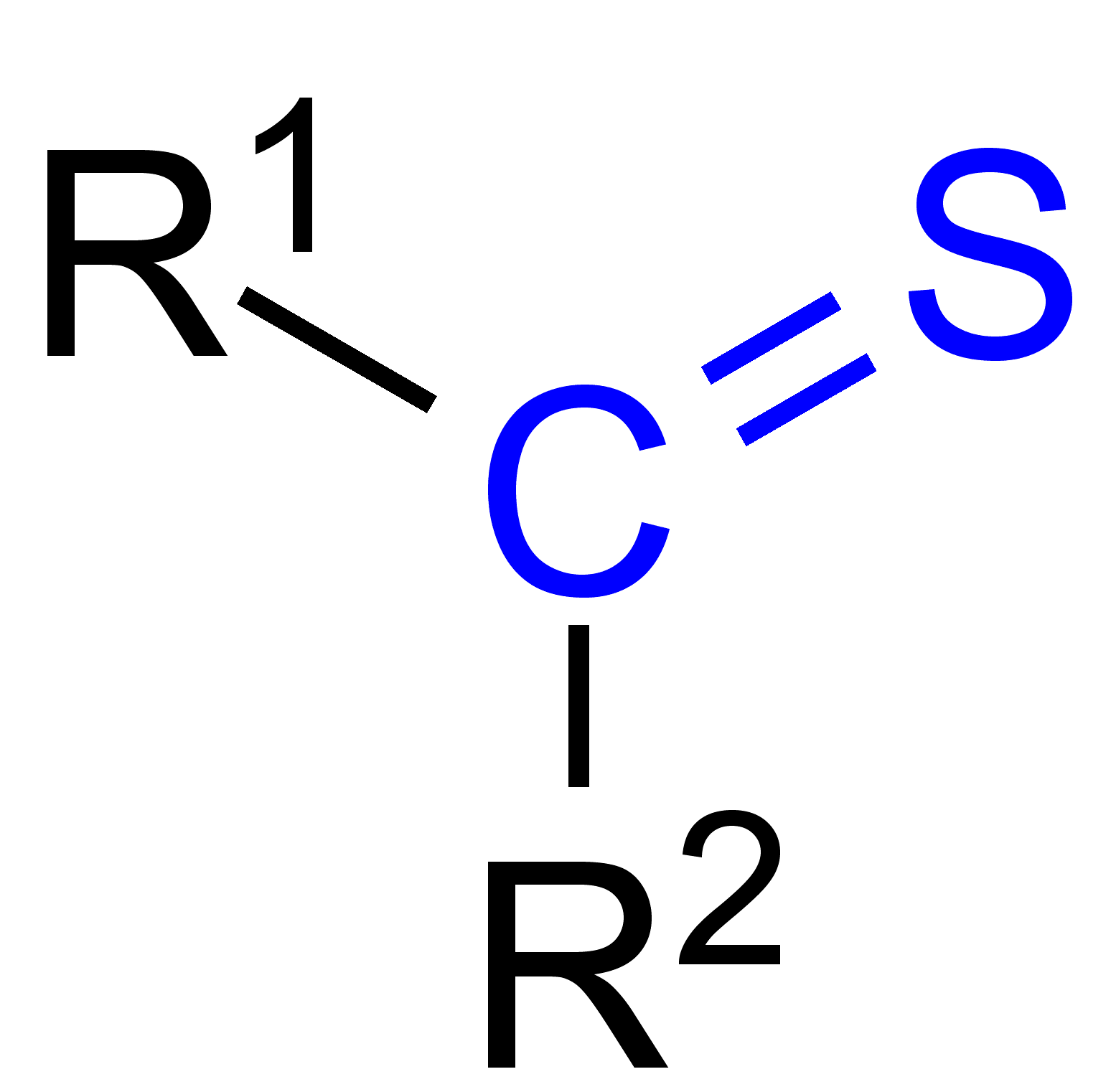
General formula of a thioketone

In organic chemistry, thioketones (from Ancient Greek θεῖον (theion) 'sulfur'; also known as thiones or thiocarbonyls) are organosulfur compounds related to conventional ketones in which the oxygen has been replaced by a sulfur. Instead of a structure of R_{2}C=O, thioketones have the structure R_{2}C=S, which is reflected by the prefix "thio-" in the name of the functional group. Thus the simplest thioketone is thioacetone, the sulfur analog of acetone. Unhindered alkylthioketones typically tend to form polymers or rings.

== Structure and bonding ==
The C=S bond length of thiobenzophenone is 1.63 Å, which is comparable to 1.64 Å, the C=S bond length of thioformaldehyde, measured in the gas phase. Due to steric interactions, the phenyl groups are not coplanar and the dihedral angle SC-CC is 36°. Unhindered dialkylthiones polymerize or oligomerize but thiocamphor is well characterized red solid.

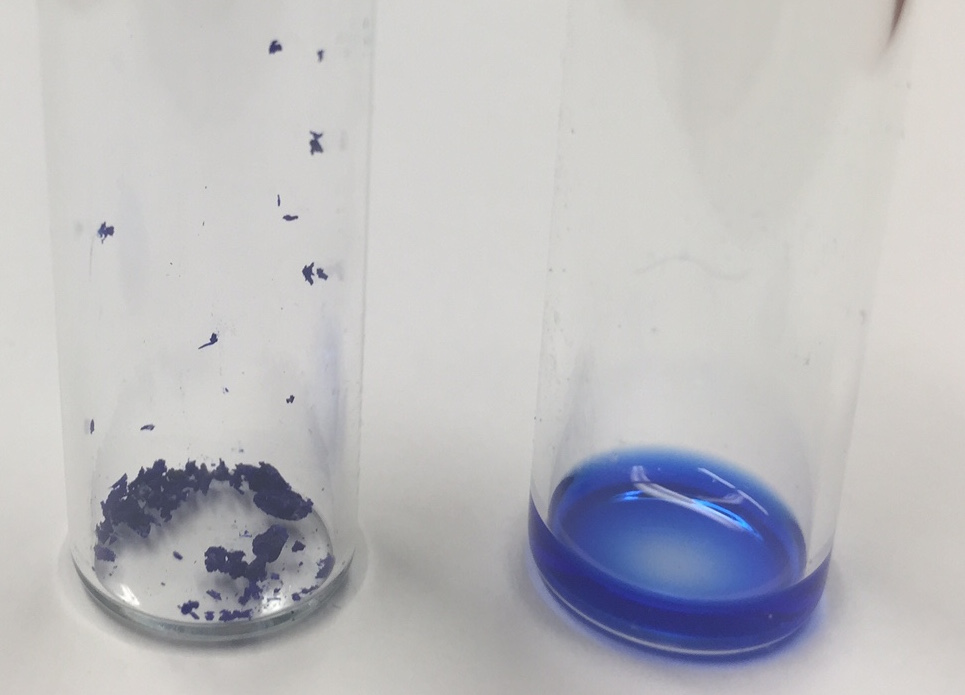
Solution and solid samples of thiobenzophenone. The blue color is consistent with a small HOMO–LUMO gap associated with the thiocarbonyl functional group.

Consistent with the double bond rule, most alkyl thioketones are unstable with respect to dimerization. The energy difference between the p orbitals of sulfur and carbon is greater than that between oxygen and carbon in ketones. The relative difference in energy and diffusity of the atomic orbitals of sulfur compared with carbon results in poor overlap of the atomic orbitals and the energy gap between the HOMO and LUMO is thus reduced for C=S molecular orbitals relative to C=O. The striking blue appearance of thiobenzophenone is attributed to π→ π* transitions upon the absorption of red light. Thiocamphor is red.

== Preparative methods ==
Thiones are usually prepared from ketones using reagents that exchange S and O atoms. A common reagent is phosphorus pentasulfide, although that reagent also tends to induce side-reactions. Lawesson's reagent is related. Other methods uses a mixture of hydrogen chloride combined with hydrogen sulfide. Bis(trimethylsilyl)sulfide has also been employed. Thiones can also be prepared from geminal dichlorides, but geminal dichlorides are typically prepared from ketones as well.

There are no general methods to oxidize methylene groups to thioketones, reflecting sulfur's comparable electronegativity to carbon.

Thiobenzophenone [(C_{6}H_{5})_{2}CS] is a stable deep blue compound that dissolves readily in organic solvents. It photooxidizes in air to benzophenone and sulfur. Since its discovery, a variety of related thiones have been prepared.

== Thiosulfines ==
Thiosulfines, also called thiocarbonyl S-sulfides, are compounds with the formula R_{2}CSS. They form when thiocarbonyls desulfurize a thiirane, or when disulfur dichloride oxidizes a ketonic hydrazone. Although superficially appearing to be cumulenes, with the linkage R_{2}C=S=S, they are more usefully classified as 1,3-dipoles (R_{2}C=S^{+}–S^{−}). Indeed, they participate in 1,3-dipolar cycloadditions. A related compound is para‑thionitrosodimethylaniline S‑sulfide, produced from Lawesson's reagent and the corresponding nitroso compound and likely with a substantial quinonic resonance form.

Thiosulfines are often invoked as intermediates in mechanistic discussions of the chemistry of thiones. For example, thiobenzophenone decomposes upon oxidation to the 3,3,5,5-tetraphenyl-1,2,4-trithiolane (Ph_{2}C)_{2}S_{3}, which arises via the cycloaddition of Ph_{2}CSS to its parent Ph_{2}CS.

Thiosulfines have been proposed to exist in equilibrium with dithiiranes, three-membered CS_{2} rings; and certainly some dithiiranes rearrange to the thiosulfine. But experiments have failed to find the reverse reaction.

== External links and further reading ==
- Kroto, H.; Landsberg, B. M.; Suffolk, R. J.; Vodden, A. (1974). "The photoelectron and microwave spectra of the unstable species thioacetaldehyde, CH_{3}CHS, and thioacetone, (CH_{3})_{2}CS". Chemical Physics Letters. 29 (2): 265–269. Bibcode:1974CPL....29..265K. doi:10.1016/0009-2614(74)85029-3.
- Cooper, N.J. (2005). "Thioaldehydes and Thioketones". Comprehensive Organic Functional Group Transformations II. pp. 355–396. doi:10.1016/B0-08-044655-8/00053-2. ISBN 978-0-08-044655-4.
- Murai, Toshiaki (2018). "The Construction and Application of C=S Bonds". Topics in Current Chemistry. 376 (4) 31. doi:10.1007/s41061-018-0209-0. PMID 29987439. S2CID 51605664.

== See also ==
- Thial, for a description of thioaldehydes.
- Thioketene
- Sulfene
- Selone (often called selenone)
