= Vegetarianism and wine =

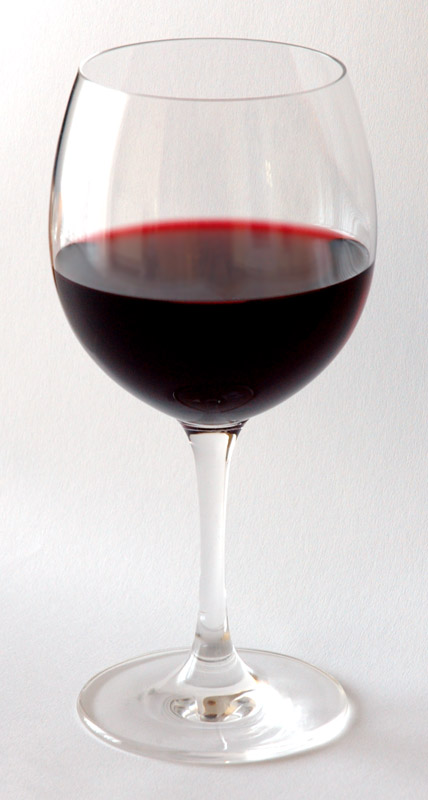
A glass of red wine

Vegetarian or vegan wines are wines created without the use of animal-based fining agents. Wine production often involves a fining (or "clarifying") process, in which fining agents are added to wine to remove proteins, yeast, and other suspended organic particles, and later filtered out. Fining agents can be either animal, carbon, or clay-based. Animal-based fining agents include gelatin, isinglass, egg white (albumen), and casein. The use of any animal-based agents preclude a wine from being vegan, while vegetarian wines can still use animal products that do not require slaughter, such as eggs and milk.

Since the fining agent is filtered back out of the wine, the labelling of these additives is not required or regulated in most places. However, the use of animal-derived additives in wine production is a matter of ethical concern in vegetarianism and veganism.

== Non-vegetarian/vegan additives ==
Examples of common animal products used as fining agents are gelatin, isinglass, casein, and egg albumen. Dried bull's blood was also used in some Mediterranean countries but, as a legacy of bovine spongiform encephalopathy, is not allowed in the U.S. or the European Union.

=== Gelatin ===
The most common animal product used for fining is gelatin, due to its potency and effectiveness. Gelatin is made from the boiling of animal parts. Wine specifically responds best to type A gelatin, which is derived from the boiling of pig's skin. It takes only one ounce of gelatin to clarify 1,000 gallons of wine. Gelatin is used in both white and red wines to fix haze/color and to adjust the flavor or bitterness of the wine.

=== Isinglass ===
Isinglass is derived from fish bladders. It is primarily used to clear white wines. Like gelatin, isinglass needs to be used sparingly to prevent residual traces in the wine due to its potency.

=== Casein ===
Casein is the main protein found in cow's milk. It makes up 80% of the proteins and is derived by first skimming milk of its fat, then a process of precipitation to separate remaining particles of the milk and in the end be left with casein proteins. Casein is used in both red and white wines to clarify and treat and prevent oxidization.

=== Egg Albumen ===
Egg albumen are the whites of a raw chicken egg. It is most commonly used in the clarification of red wines to remove excess tannins.

== Vegan and vegetarian alternative fining agents ==
As an alternative to animal products, carbon, bentonite, a clay mineral, and polyvinylpolypyrrolidone are the most common to be used to clarify wine. In Australia, winemakers are required to list the use of potential allergens such as casein and albumin on the label. Still, they are not obliged to list the use of other animal-based fining agents such as gelatin or isinglass. In the EU, regulations only stipulate that wines fined using milk or egg products (both allergens) must be clearly labelled.

Some winemakers believe that fining removes desirable flavours and aromas and instead let the wine's sediments settle naturally, which is a time-consuming process. Natural wines are a growing trend, which are unfiltered by their very nature.

== Labelling requirements ==
It is not required for products to disclose whether they are vegan/vegetarian or not. Even products that choose to label their products with titles are not required to show proof that they are free of animal byproducts, animal testing, or any form of animal exploitation. In 2006, a proposal was submitted to the Tax and Trade Bureau to mandate the labelling of major allergens such as milk, eggs, and fish included in the production of wine (whether it is filtered out or not).

A study found that exposure to allergens in wine showed no reactions through in-vitro methods, but had positive skin pricks tests in patients who consumed/were allergic to wines fined with milk, fish, and eggs.

== See also ==
- Glossary of wine terms
- Vegetarianism and beer
