= Winemaking =

Production of wine

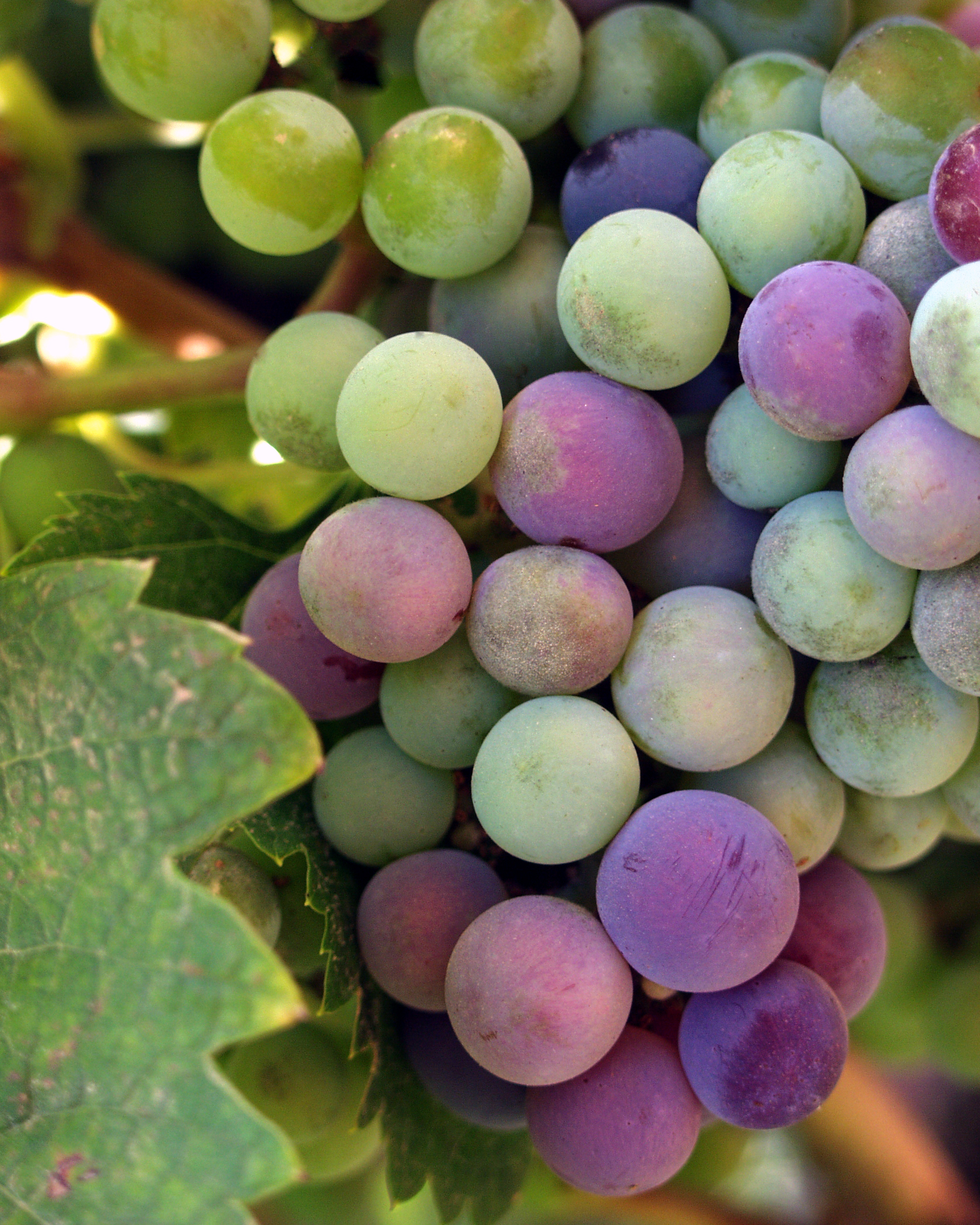
Wine grapes from the Guadalupe Valley in Ensenada, Baja California, Mexico

Winemaking, wine-making, or vinification is the production of wine, starting with the selection of the fruit, its fermentation into alcohol, and the bottling of the finished liquid. The history of wine-making stretches over millennia. There is evidence that suggests that the earliest wine production took place in Georgia and Iran around 6000 to 5000 B.C. The science of wine and winemaking is known as oenology. A winemaker may also be called a vintner. The growing of grapes is viticulture and there are many varieties of grapes.

Winemaking can be divided into two general categories: still wine production (without carbonation) and sparkling wine production (with carbonation – natural or injected). Red wine, white wine, and rosé are the other main categories. Although most wine is made from grapes, it may also be made from other plants. (See fruit wine.) Other similar light alcoholic drinks (as opposed to beer or spirits) include mead, made by fermenting honey and water, cider ("apple cider"), made by fermenting the juice of apples, and perry ("pear cider"), made by fermenting the juice of pears, and kumis, made of fermented mare's milk.

== Process ==
Anatomy of a grape, showing the components extracted from each pressing

There are five basic stages to the wine making process which begins with harvesting or picking. After the harvest, the grapes are taken into a winery and prepared for primary ferment; at this stage red wine making diverges from white wine making. Red wine is made from the must (pulp, including the juice) of red or black grapes and fermentation occurs together with the grape skins, which impart color, flavor and tannins to the wine through the process of maceration. White wine is made by fermenting juice which is made by pressing crushed grapes to extract a juice; the skins are removed and play no further role. Occasionally, white wine is made from red grapes. This is done by extracting their juice with minimal contact with the grapes' skins. Rosé wines are either made from red grapes where the juice is allowed to stay in contact with the dark skins long enough to pick up a pinkish color (maceration or saignée), or (less commonly) by blending red wine with white wine. White and rosé wines extract little of the grape tannins contained in the skins. Orange wine (a.k.a. skin-contact white wine) is wine made with maceration in the manner of rosé or red wine production, but using white wine grape varieties instead of red.

To start primary fermentation, yeast may be added to the must for red wine, or may occur naturally as ambient yeast on the grapes (or in the air). For white wine, yeast may be added to the juice. During this fermentation, which often takes between one and two weeks, the yeast converts most of the sugars in the grape juice into ethanol (alcohol) and carbon dioxide (which is lost to the atmosphere).

After the primary fermentation of red grapes, the free run wine is pumped off into tanks and the skins are pressed to extract the remaining juice and wine. The press wine is blended with the free run wine at the winemaker's discretion. The wine is then kept warm and the remaining sugars are converted into alcohol and carbon dioxide.

The next process in the making of red wine is malolactic conversion, a bacterial process that converts "crisp, green apple" malic acid to "soft, creamy" lactic acid, softening the taste of the wine. Red wine is characteristically transferred to white oak barrels to mature for a period of weeks or months; this practice imparts oak aromas and some oak tannins to the wine. The wine must be settled or clarified and adjustments made prior to bottling.

The time from harvest to drinking can vary from a few months for Beaujolais nouveau wines (made by carbonic maceration) to over twenty years for wine of good structure with high levels of acid, tannin or sugar. However, only about 10% of all red and 5% of white wine will taste better after five years than they will after just one year. Depending on the quality of the grape and the target wine style, some of these steps may be combined or omitted to achieve the particular goals of the winemaker. Many wines of comparable quality are produced using similar but distinctly different approaches to their production.

Variations on the above procedure exist. With sparkling wines such as Champagne and Methodé Champenoise (sparkling wine that is fermented in the style of champagne but is not from the Champagne region of France), an additional, "secondary" fermentation takes place inside the bottle, dissolving trapped carbon dioxide in the wine and creating the characteristic bubbles. Bottles then spend 6 months on a riddling rack before being disgorged to remove any sediment that has accrued. An expedited technique using sealed tanks to contain carbon dioxide is known as the bulk Charmat method. Other sparkling wines, such as prosecco, are fermented using force-carbonation — a faster process that involves using machinery to manually add CO_{2} and create bubbles. Sweet wines or off-dry wines are made by arresting fermentation before all sugar has been converted into ethanol and allowing some residual sugar to remain. This can be done by chilling the wine and adding sulphur and other allowable additives to inhibit yeast activity, or by sterile filtering the wine to remove all yeast and bacteria. In the case of sweet wines, initial sugar concentrations are increased by harvesting late (late harvest wine), freezing the grapes to concentrate the sugar (ice wine), allowing or encouraging Botrytis cinerea fungus to dehydrate the grapes or allowing the grapes to raisin either on the vine or on racks or straw mats. Often in these high sugar wines, the fermentation stops naturally as the high concentration of sugar and rising concentration of ethanol retard the yeast activity. Similarly in fortified wines, such as port wine, high proof neutral grape spirit (brandy) is added to arrest the fermentation and adjust the alcohol content when the desired sugar level has been reached. In other cases, the winemaker may choose to hold back some of the sweet grape juice and add it to the wine after the fermentation is done, a technique known in Germany as süssreserve.

The process produces wastewater, pomace, and lees that require collection, treatment, and disposal or beneficial use.

Synthetic wines (also known as engineered wines or fake wines) are a product that do not use grapes at all. Starting with water and ethanol, a number of additives are included, such as acids, amino acids, sugars, and organic compounds.

== Grapes ==
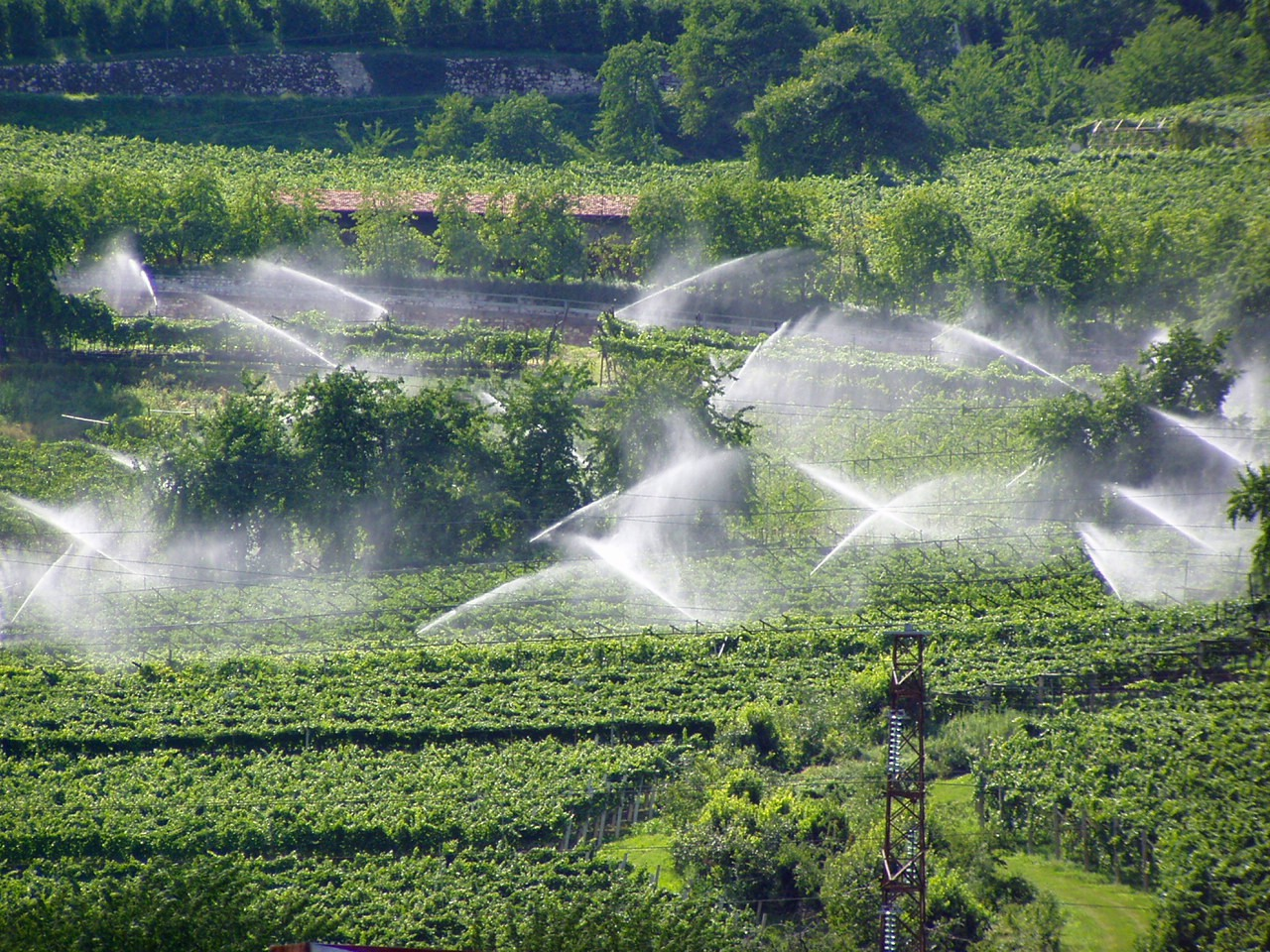
Vineyards in Italy

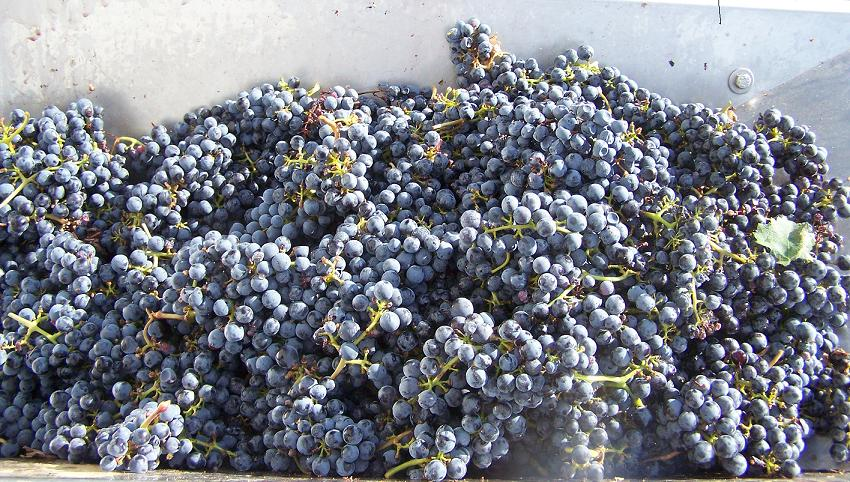
Harvested Cabernet Sauvignon grapes

The quality of the grapes determines the quality of the wine more than any other factor. Grape quality is affected by variety as well as weather during the growing season, soil minerals and acidity, time of harvest, and pruning method. The combination of these effects is often referred to as the grape's terroir. Given the sensitivity of grapes to weather patterns, winemaking is affected by climate change.

Grapes are usually harvested from the vineyard from early September until early November in the northern hemisphere, and mid February until early March in the southern hemisphere. In some cool areas in the southern hemisphere (such as in Tasmania), harvesting extends into May.

The most common species of wine grape is Vitis vinifera, which includes nearly all varieties of European origin.

== Harvesting and destemming ==
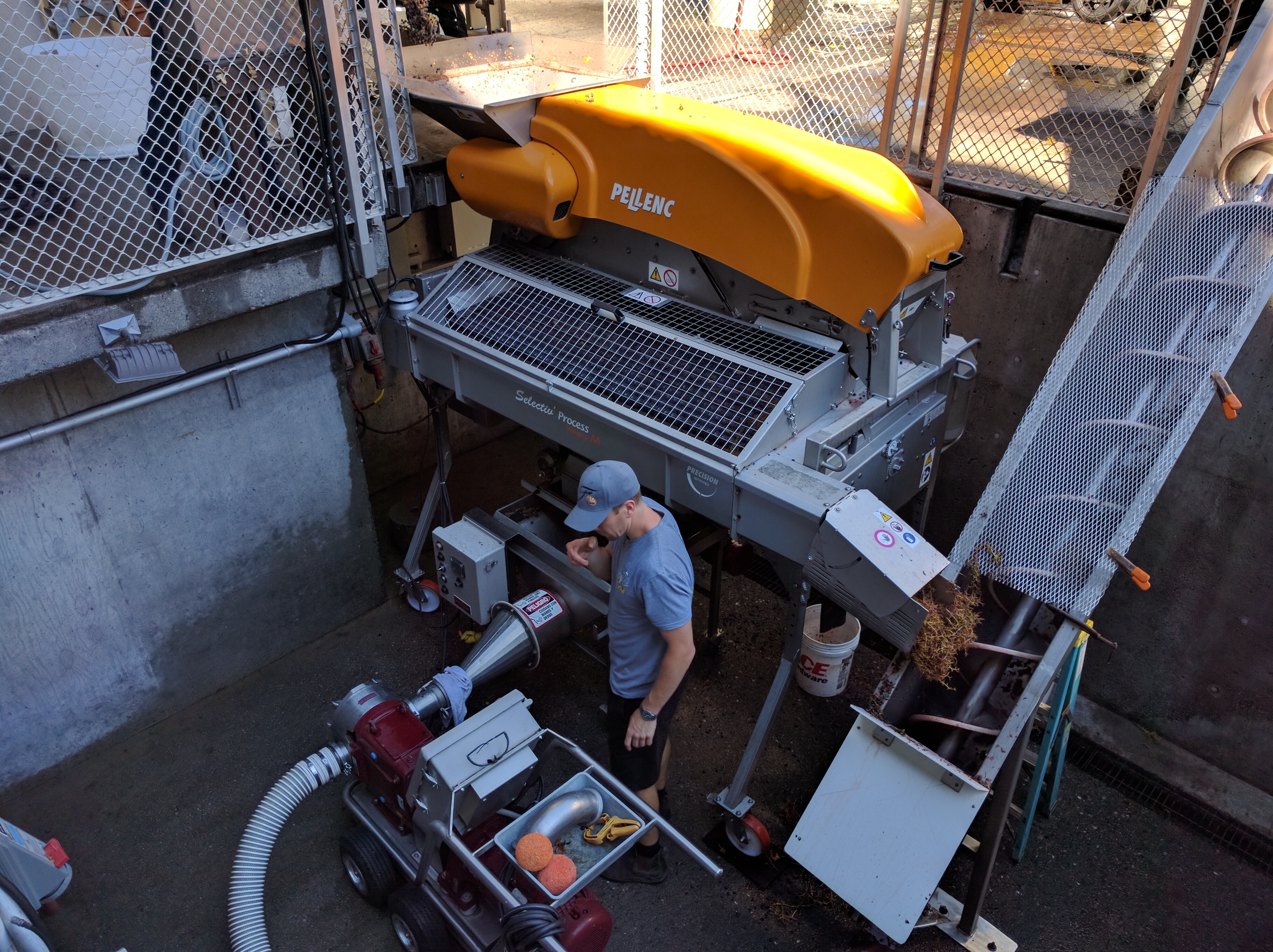
A mechanical destemming machine in use at Chateau Montelena winery in Napa Valley

Harvest is the picking of the grapes and in many ways the first step in wine production. Grapes are either harvested mechanically or by hand. The decision to harvest grapes is typically made by the winemaker and informed by the level of sugar (called °Brix), acid (TA or Titratable Acidity as expressed by tartaric acid equivalents) and pH of the grapes. Other considerations include phenological ripeness, berry flavor, tannin development (seed color and taste). Overall disposition of the grapevine and weather forecasts are taken into account.

Mechanical harvesters are large tractors that straddle grapevine trellises and, using firm plastic or rubber rods, strike the fruiting zone of the grapevine to dislodge the grapes from the rachis. Mechanical harvesters have the advantage of being able to cover a large area of vineyard land in a relatively short period of time, and with a minimum investment of manpower per harvested ton. A disadvantage of mechanical harvesting is the indiscriminate inclusion of foreign non-grape material in the product, especially leaf stems and leaves, but also, depending on the trellis system and grapevine canopy management, may include moldy grapes, canes, metal debris, rocks and even small animals and bird nests. Some winemakers remove leaves and loose debris from the grapevine before mechanical harvesting to avoid such material being included in the harvested fruit. In the United States mechanical harvesting is seldom used for premium winemaking because of the indiscriminate picking and increased oxidation of the grape juice. In other countries (such as Australia and New Zealand), mechanical harvesting of premium winegrapes is more common because of general labor shortages.

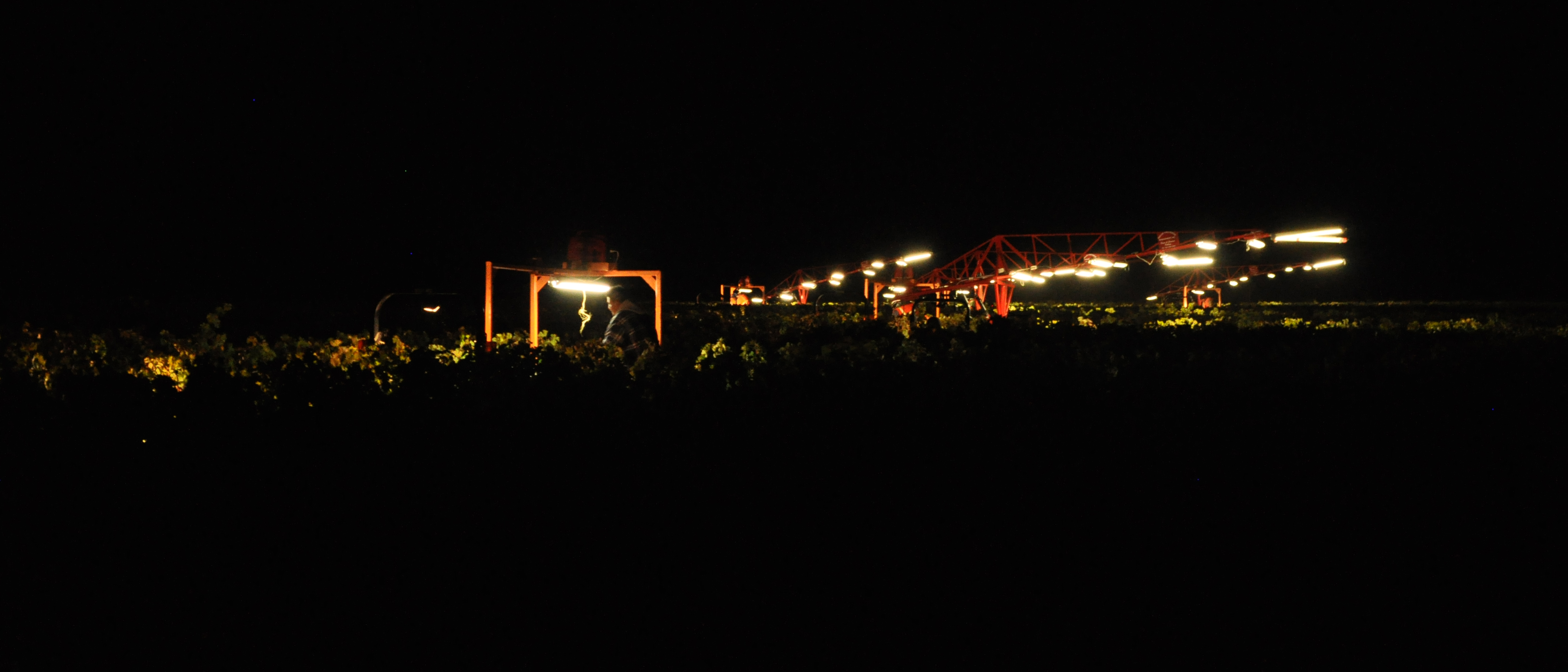
Night harvest by hand of wine grapes in Napa, California

Manual harvesting is the hand-picking of grape clusters from the grapevines. In the United States, some grapes are picked into one- or two-ton bins for transport back to the winery. Manual harvesting has the advantage of using knowledgeable labor to not only pick the ripe clusters but also to leave behind the clusters that are not ripe or contain bunch rot or other defects. This can be an effective first line of defense to prevent inferior quality fruit from contaminating a lot or tank of wine.

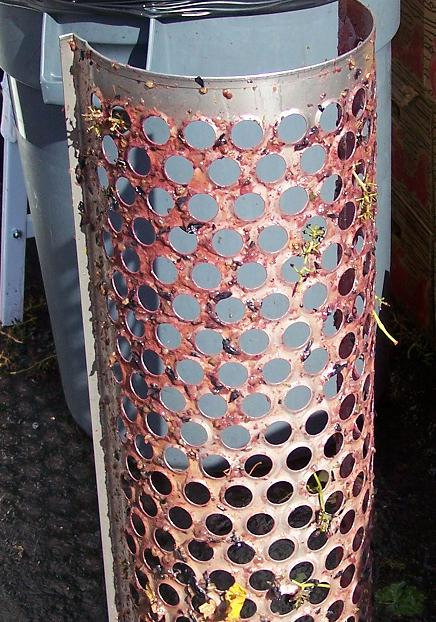
Central component of a mechanical destemming. Paddles above the small circular slots rotate to remove the larger chunks of stems. Grapes are pulled off the stems and fall through the holes. Some small amount of stem particles are usually desired to be kept with the grapes for tannin structure.

Destemming is the process of separating stems from the grapes. Depending on the winemaking procedure, this process may be undertaken before crushing with the purpose of lowering the development of tannins and vegetal flavors in the resulting wine. Single berry harvesting, as is done with some German Trockenbeerenauslese, avoids this step altogether with the grapes being individually selected.

== Crushing and primary (alcoholic) fermentation ==
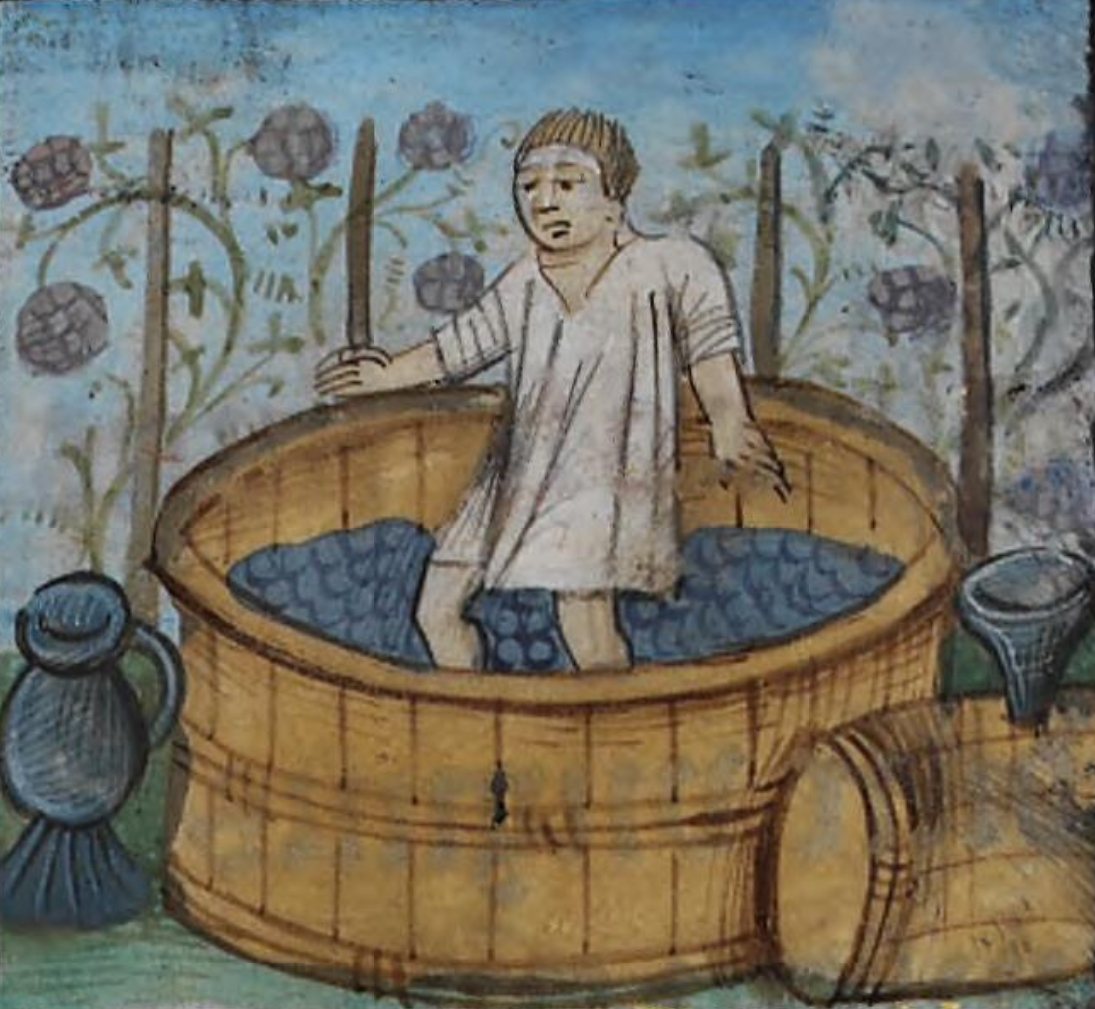
In ancient times, berries were crushed by foot in a barrel or pit

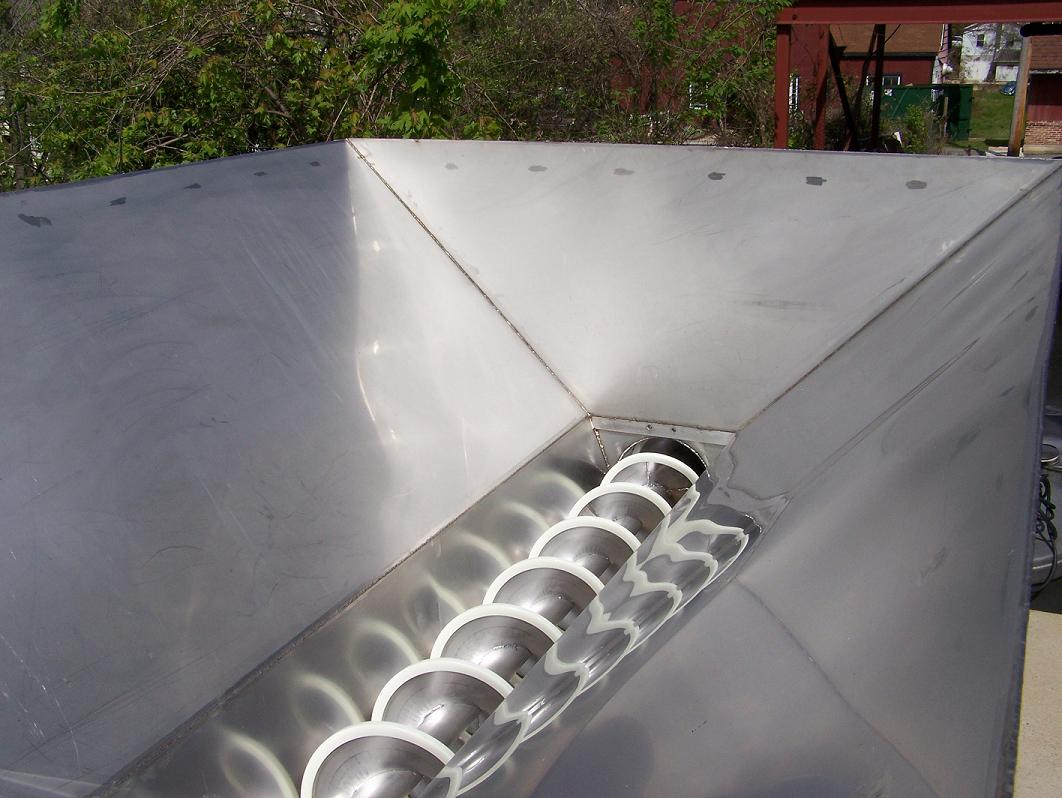
The corkscrew-shaped feed auger sits on top of a mechanical crusher-destemmer. Grape clusters are fed into the machine, where they are first crushed, then destemmed. Stems exit at the end, while juice, skins, seeds, and some debris exit the bottom.

Crushing is the process when gently squeezing the berries and breaking the skins to start to liberate the contents of the berries. Destemming is the process of removing the grapes from the rachis (the stem which holds the grapes). In traditional and smaller-scale wine making, the harvested grapes are sometimes crushed by trampling them barefoot or by the use of inexpensive small scale crushers. These can also destem at the same time. However, in larger wineries, a mechanical crusher/destemmer is used. The decision about destemming is different for red and white wine making. Generally when making white wine the fruit is only crushed, the stems are then placed in the press with the berries. The presence of stems in the mix facilitates pressing by allowing juice to flow past flattened skins. These accumulate at the edge of the press. For red winemaking, stems of the grapes are usually removed before fermentation since the stems have a relatively high tannin content; in addition to tannin they can also give the wine a vegetal aroma (due to extraction of 3-isobutyl-2-methoxypyrazine which has an aroma reminiscent of green bell peppers). On occasion, the winemaker may decide to leave them in if the grapes themselves contain less tannin than desired. This is more acceptable if the stems have 'ripened' and started to turn brown. If increased skin extraction is desired, a winemaker might choose to crush the grapes after destemming. Removal of stems first means no stem tannin can be extracted. In these cases the grapes pass between two rollers which squeeze the grapes enough to separate the skin and pulp, but not so much as to cause excessive shearing or tearing of the skin tissues. In some cases, notably with "delicate" red varietals such as Pinot noir or Syrah, all or part of the grapes might be left uncrushed (called "whole berry") to encourage the retention of fruity aromas through partial carbonic maceration.

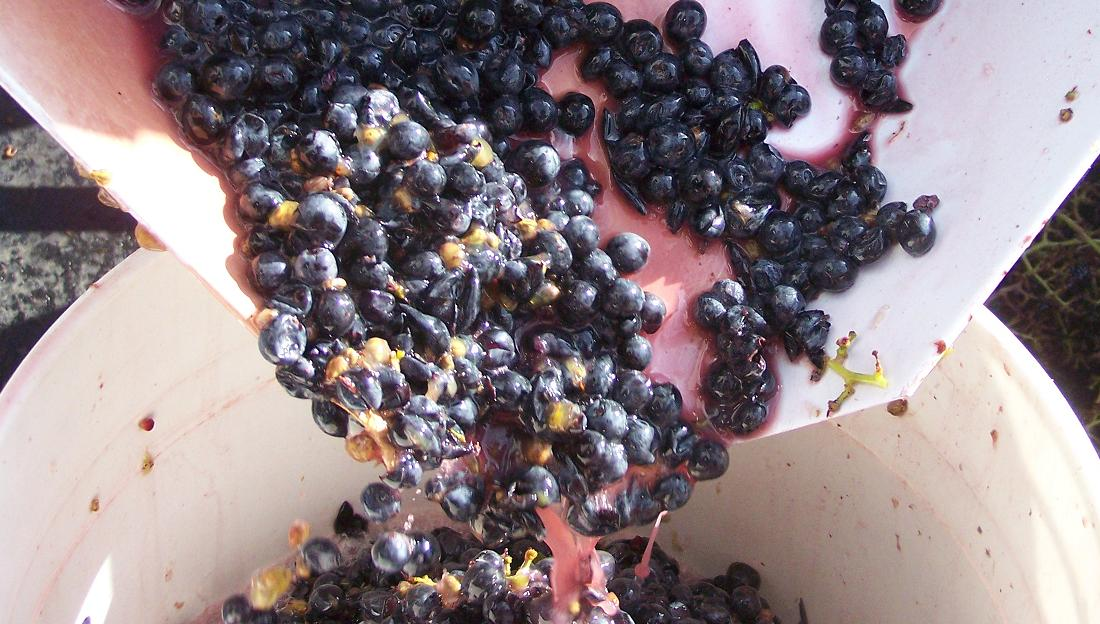
Crushed grapes leaving the crusher

Most red wines derive their color from grape skins (the exception being varieties or hybrids of non-vinifera vines which contain juice pigmented with the dark Malvidin 3,5-diglucoside anthocyanin) and therefore contact between the juice and skins is essential for color extraction. Red wines are produced by destemming and crushing the grapes into a tank and leaving the skins in contact with the juice throughout the fermentation (maceration). It is possible to produce white (colorless) wines from red grapes by the fastidious pressing of uncrushed fruit. This minimizes contact between grape juice and skins (as in the making of Blanc de noirs sparkling wine, which is derived from Pinot noir, a red vinifera grape).

An alternative method to maceration is hot press or thermovinification. In this practice, winemakers heat up the grapes to extract the juice rather than pressing using a pressure method. The temperature and time ranges depending on the grape variety and preferences of the winemaker. In addition to extracting the juice, this method is sometimes referred to as pre-fermentation maceration as it extracts tannins and pigment from the skins. As a result this is applicable to red grape varieties that would otherwise undergo traditional maceration.

Most white wines are processed without destemming or crushing and are transferred from picking bins directly to the press. This is to avoid any extraction of tannin from either the skins or grapeseeds, as well as maintaining proper juice flow through a matrix of grape clusters rather than loose berries. In some circumstances winemakers choose to crush white grapes for a short period of skin contact, usually for three to 24 hours. This serves to extract flavor and tannin from the skins (the tannin being extracted to encourage protein precipitation without excessive Bentonite addition) as well as potassium ions, which participate in bitartrate precipitation (cream of tartar). It also results in an increase in the pH of the juice which may be desirable for overly acidic grapes. This was a practice more common in the 1970s than today, though still practiced by some Sauvignon blanc and Chardonnay producers in California.

In the case of rosé wines, the fruit is crushed and the dark skins are left in contact with the juice just long enough to extract the color that the winemaker desires. The must is then pressed, and fermentation continues as if the winemaker was making a white wine.

Yeast is normally already present on the grapes, often visible as a powdery appearance of the grapes. The primary, or alcoholic fermentation can be done with this natural yeast, but since this can give unpredictable results depending on the exact types of yeast that are present, cultured yeast is often added to the must. One of the main problems with the use of wild ferments is the failure for the fermentation to go to completion, that is some sugar remains unfermented. This can make the wine sweet when a dry wine is desired. Frequently wild ferments lead to the production of unpleasant acetic acid (vinegar) production as a by product.

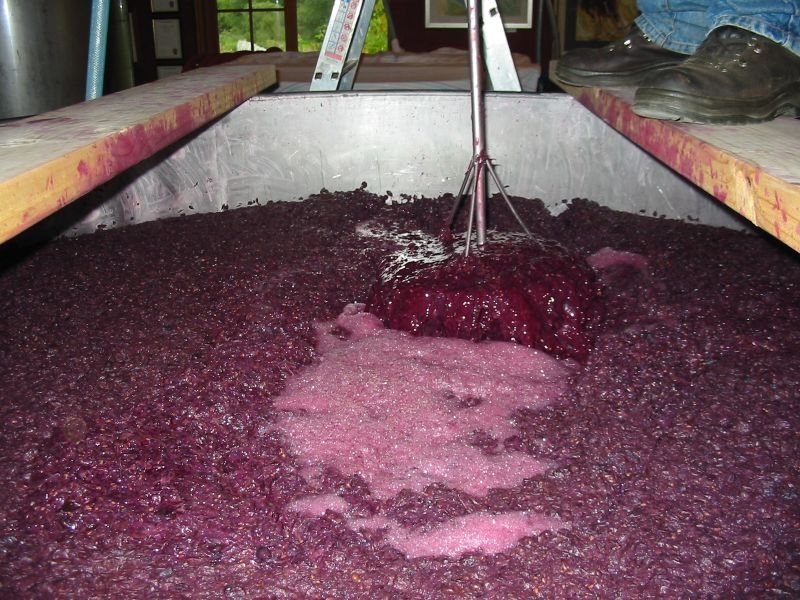
A cap of grape skins forms on the surface of fermenting red wine

During the primary fermentation, the yeast cells feed on the sugars in the must and multiply, producing carbon dioxide gas and alcohol. The temperature during the fermentation affects both the taste of the end product, as well as the speed of the fermentation. For red wines, the temperature is typically 22 to 25 °C, and for white wines 15 to 18 °C. For every gram of sugar that is converted, about half a gram of alcohol is produced, so to achieve a 12% alcohol concentration, the must should contain about 24% sugars. The sugar percentage of the must is calculated from the measured density, the must weight, with the help of a specialized type of hydrometer called a saccharometer. If the sugar content of the grapes is too low to obtain the desired alcohol percentage, sugar can be added (chaptalization). In commercial winemaking, chaptalization is subject to local regulations.

Similar to chaptalization is amelioration. While chaptalization aims to raise final alcohol percentage through the addition of sugar, amelioration aims to raise the alcohol percentage and dilute the acidity levels through the addition of water and sugar into the grape must. This wine adjustment was commonly used in New York State's cooler wine regions, such as the Finger Lakes AVA. Amelioration is also subject to federal regulations.

Alcohol of more than 12% can be achieved by using yeast that can withstand high alcohol. Some yeasts can produce 18% alcohol in the wine however extra sugar is added to produce a high alcohol content.

During or after the alcoholic fermentation, a secondary, or malolactic fermentation can also take place, during which specific strains of bacteria (lactobacter) convert malic acid into the milder lactic acid. This fermentation is often initiated by inoculation with desired bacteria.

=== Pressing ===
Pressing is the act of applying pressure to grapes or pomace in order to separate juice or wine from grapes and grape skins. Pressing is not always a necessary act in winemaking; if grapes are crushed there is a considerable amount of juice immediately liberated (called free-run juice) that can be used for vinification. Typically this free-run juice is of a higher quality than the press juice. Pressed juice is typically lesser in quality due to the release and increase of total phenolic compounds, as well as browning index and the C6-alcohol levels. These compounds are responsible for the herb-like taste perceived in wine with pressed grapes. However, most wineries do use presses in order to increase their production (gallons) per ton, as pressed juice can represent between 15%-30% of the total juice volume from the grape.

Presses act by positioning the grape skins or whole grape clusters between a rigid surface and a movable surface and slowly decrease the volume between the two surfaces. Modern presses dictate the duration and pressure at each press cycle, usually ramping from 0 Bar to 2.0 Bar. Sometimes winemakers choose pressures which separate the streams of pressed juice, called making "press cuts". As the pressure increases the amount of tannin extracted from the skins into the juice increases, often rendering the pressed juice excessively tannic or harsh. Because of the location of grape juice constituents in the berry (water and acid are found primarily in the mesocarp or pulp, whereas tannins are found primarily in the exocarp, or skin, and seeds), pressed juice or wine tends to be lower in acidity with a higher pH than the free-run juice.

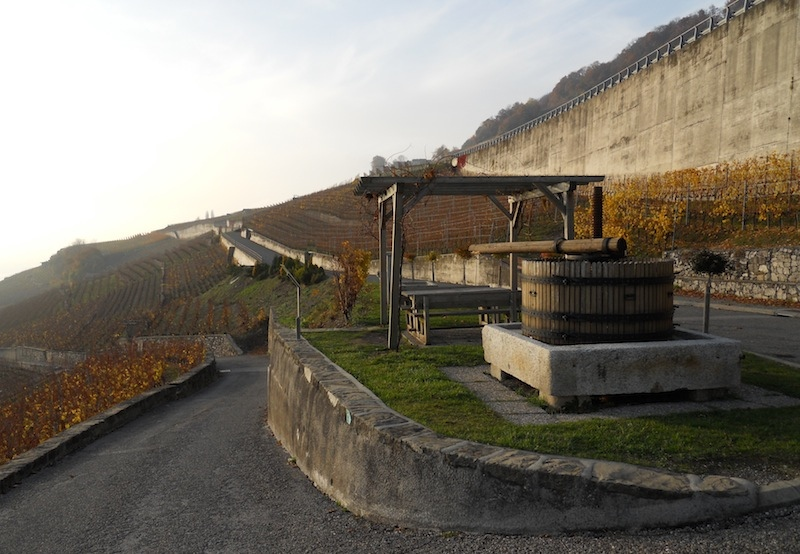
Antique wooden wine press in front of World Heritage vineyards

Before the advent of modern winemaking, most presses were basket presses made of wood and operated manually. Basket presses are composed of a cylinder of wooden slats on top of a fixed plate, with a moveable plate that can be forced downward (usually by a central ratcheting threaded screw). The press operator would load the grapes or pomace into the wooden cylinder, put the top plate in place and lower it until juice flowed from the wooden slats. As the juice flow decreased, the plate was ratcheted down again. This process continued until the press operator determined that the quality of the pressed juice or wine was below standard, or all liquids had been pressed. Since the early 1990s, modern mechanical basket presses have been revived through higher-end producers seeking to replicate the gentle pressing of the historical basket presses. Because basket presses have a relatively compact design, the press cake offers a relatively longer pathway for the juice to travel before leaving the press. It is believed by advocates of basket presses that this relatively long pathway through the grape or pomace cake serves as a filter to solids that would otherwise affect the quality of the press juice.

With red wines, the must is pressed after primary fermentation, which separates the skins and other solid matter from the liquid. With white wine, the liquid is separated from the must before fermentation. With rose, the skins may be kept in contact for a shorter period to give color to the wine, in that case the must may be pressed as well. After a period in which the wine stands or ages, the wine is separated from the dead yeast and any solids that remained (called lees), and transferred to a new container where any additional fermentation may take place.

=== Pigeage ===
Pigeage is a French term for the management of acidity and secondary pressing of grapes in fermentation tanks. To make certain types of wine, grapes are put through a crusher and then poured into open fermentation tanks. Once fermentation begins, the grape skins are floated to the surface by carbon dioxide gases released in the fermentation process. This layer of skins and other solids is known as the cap. As the skins are the source of the tannins, the cap needs to be mixed through the liquid each day, or "punched", which traditionally is done by stomping through the vat.

== Cold stabilization ==
Cold stabilization is a process used in winemaking to reduce tartrate crystals (generally potassium bitartrate) in wine. These tartrate crystals look like grains of clear sand, and are also known as "wine crystals" or "wine diamonds". While these crystals that are formed from tartaric acid and potassium may appear to be a kind of sediment, they are not. During the cold stabilizing process after fermentation, the temperature of the wine is dropped to close to freezing for 1–2 weeks. This will cause the crystals to separate from the wine and stick to the sides of the holding vessel. When the wine is drained from the vessels, the tartrates are left behind. This process improves the wine's aesthetic clarity and commercial appeal, as consumers often mistake harmless tartrate crystals for glass shards or wine faults. They may also form in wine bottles that have been stored under very cold conditions.

== Secondary (malolactic) fermentation and bulk aging ==
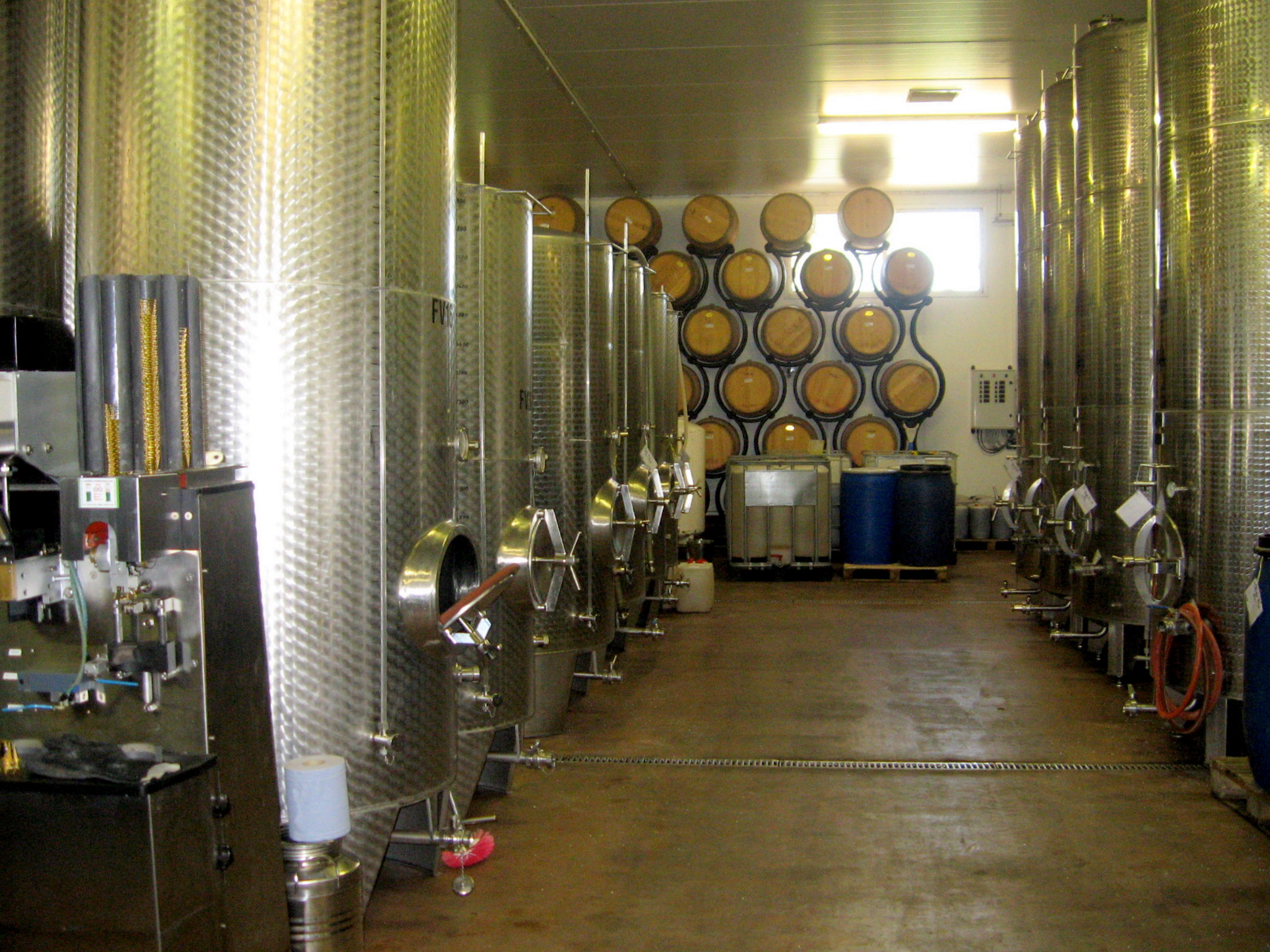
Stainless steel fermentation vessels and new oak barrels at the Three Choirs Vineyard, Gloucestershire, England

During the secondary fermentation and aging process, which takes three to six months, the fermentation continues very slowly. The wine is kept under an airlock to protect the wine from oxidation. Proteins from the grape are broken down and the remaining yeast cells and other fine particles from the grapes are allowed to settle. Potassium bitartrate will also precipitate, a process which can be enhanced by cold stabilization to prevent the appearance of (harmless) tartrate crystals after bottling. The result of these processes is that the originally cloudy wine becomes clear. The wine can be racked during this process to remove the lees.

The secondary fermentation usually takes place in large stainless steel vessels with a volume of several cubic meters, oak barrels or glass demijohns (also referred to as carboys), depending on the goals of the winemakers. Unoaked wine is fermented in a barrel made of stainless steel or other material having no influence on the final taste of the wine. Depending on the desired taste, it could be fermented mainly in stainless steel to be briefly put in oak, or have the complete fermentation done in stainless steel. Oak could be added as chips used with a non-wooden barrel instead of a fully wooden barrel. This process is mainly used in cheaper wine.

Amateur winemakers often use glass carboys in the production of their wine; these vessels (sometimes called demijohns) have a capacity of 4.5–54 litres (0.99–11.88 imp gal; 1.2–14.3 US gal). The kind of vessel used depends on the amount of wine that is being made, the grapes being used, and the intentions of the winemaker.

== Malolactic fermentation ==
Malolactic fermentation occurs when lactic acid bacteria, primarily from the genera of Oenococcus, Lactobacillus, Pediococcus, and Leuconostoc, metabolize malic acid and produce lactic acid and carbon dioxide. This is carried out either as an intentional procedure in which specially cultivated strains of such bacteria are introduced into the maturing wine, or it can happen by chance if uncultivated lactic acid bacteria are present. In addition to affecting acidity, malolactic fermentation also contributes to microbial stability by reducing the availability of malic acid as a nutrient source for spoilage organisms.

Malolactic fermentation can improve the taste of wine that has high levels of malic acid, because malic acid, in higher concentration, generally causes an unpleasant harsh and bitter taste sensation, whereas lactic acid is more gentle and less sour. Lactic acid is an acid found in dairy products. Malolactic fermentation usually results in a reduction in the amount of total acidity of the wine. This is because malic acid has two acid radicals (-COOH) while lactic acid has only one. However, the pH should be monitored and not allowed to rise above a pH of 3.55 for whites or a pH of 3.80 for reds. pH can be reduced roughly at a rate of 0.1 units per 1 gram/litre of tartaric acid addition.

The use of lactic acid bacteria is the reason why some chardonnays can taste "buttery" due to the production of diacetyl by the bacteria. Most red wines go through complete malolactic fermentation, both to lessen the acid of the wine and to remove the possibility that malolactic fermentation will occur in the bottle. White wines vary in the use of malolactic fermentation during their making. Lighter aromatic wines such as Riesling, generally do not go through malolactic fermentation. The fuller white wines, such as barrel-fermented chardonnay, are more commonly put through malolactic fermentation. Sometimes a partial fermentation, for example, somewhere less than 50% might be employed. In warmer wine regions, where higher pH is common, malolactic fermentation is not as prominent or necessary and can even be damaging to the final product. As such, malolactic fermentation is usually more accepted in colder regions of production.

== Laboratory tests ==
Whether the wine is aging in tanks or barrels, tests are run periodically in a laboratory to check the status of the wine. Common tests include Brix, pH, titratable acidity, residual sugar, free or available sulfur, total sulfur, volatile acidity (V.A.) and percent alcohol. Additional tests include those for the crystallization of cream of tartar (potassium hydrogen tartrate) and the precipitation of heat unstable protein; this last test is limited to white wines. These tests may be performed throughout the making of the wine as well as prior to bottling. In response to the results of these tests, a winemaker can decide on appropriate remedial action, for example the addition of more sulfur dioxide. Sensory tests will also be performed and again in response to these a winemaker may take remedial action such as the addition of a protein to soften the taste of the wine.

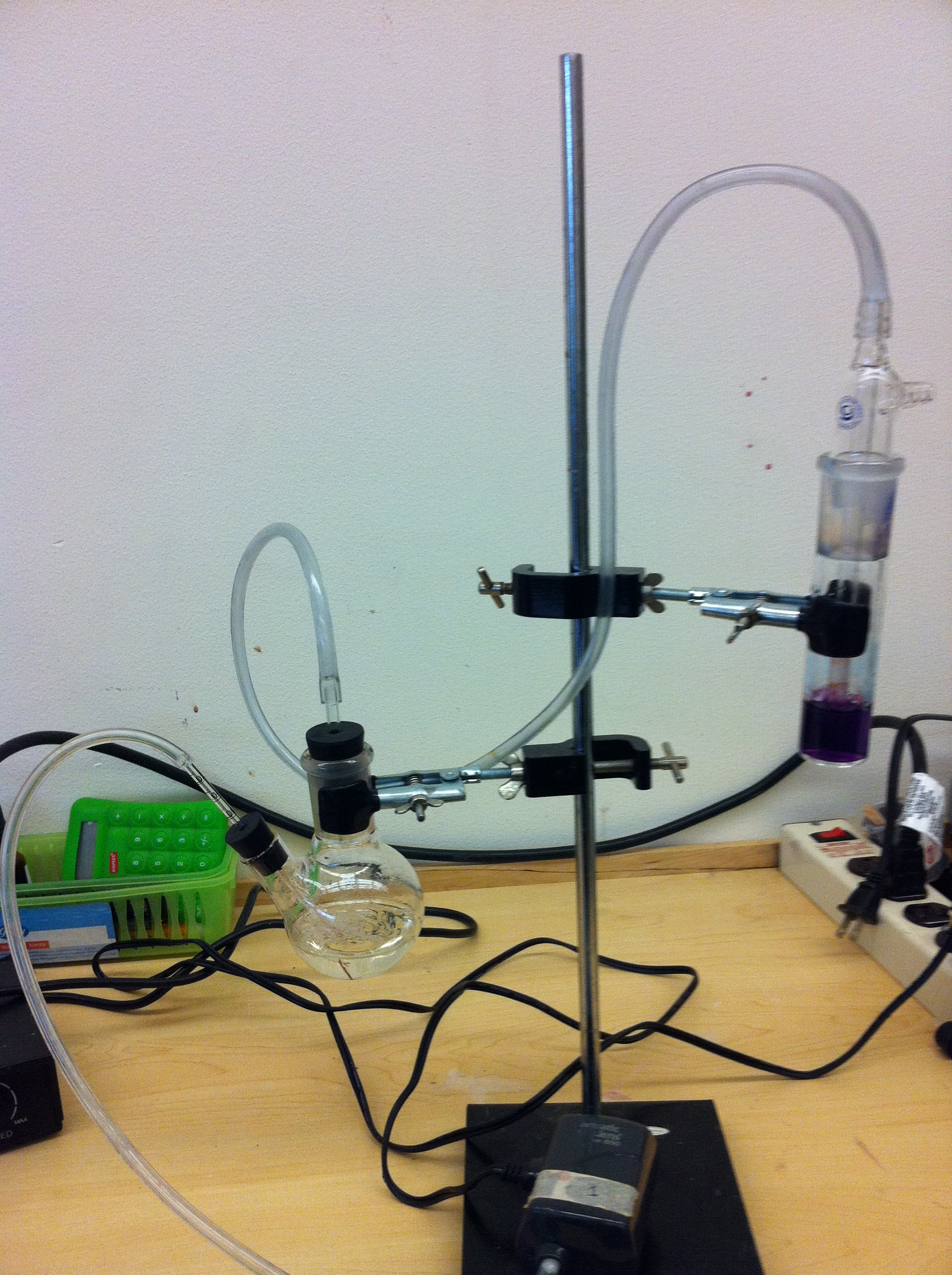
Testing wine for sulphur dioxide level

Brix (°Bx) is one measure of the soluble solids in the grape juice and represents not only the sugars but also includes many other soluble substances such as salts, acids and tannins, sometimes called total dissolved solids (TDS). Because sugar is the dominant compound in grape juice, these units are effectively a measure of sugar level. The level of sugar in the grapes determines the final alcohol content of the wine as well as indirect index of grape maturity. °Bx is measured in grams per hundred grams of solution, so 20 °Bx means that 100 grams of juice contains 20 g of dissolved compounds. There are other common measures of sugar content of grapes, specific gravity, Oechsle (Germany) and Baumé (France). °Bx is usually measured with a refractometer while the other methods use a hydrometer which measures specific gravity. Generally, hydrometers are a cheaper alternative. In the French Baumé (Be° or Bé° for short) one Be° corresponds approximately to one percent alcohol. One Be° is equal to 1.8 °Bx, that is 1.8 grams of sugar per one hundred grams. Therefore, to achieve one percent alcohol the winemaker adds sugar at a rate of 1.8 grams per 100 ml (18 grams per liter) – a practice known as chaptalization, which is illegal in some countries and in California.

Volatile acidity test verifies if there is any steam distillable acids in the wine. Mainly present is acetic acid (the dominant component of vinegar), but lactic, butyric, propionic, and formic acid can also be found. Usually the test checks for these acids in a cash still, but there are other methods available such as HPLC, gas chromatography and enzymatic methods. The amount of volatile acidity found in sound grapes is negligible, because it is a by-product of microbial metabolism. Because acetic acid bacteria require oxygen to grow, eliminating any air in wine containers as well as addition of sulfur dioxide (SO_{2}) will limit their growth. Rejecting moldy grapes also prevents possible problems associated with acetic acid bacteria. Use of sulfur dioxide and inoculation with a low-V.A. producing strain of Saccharomyces may deter acetic acid producing yeast. A relatively new method for removal of volatile acidity from a wine is reverse osmosis. Blending may also help – a wine with high V.A. can be filtered (to remove the microbe responsible) and blended with a low V.A. wine, so that the acetic acid level is below the sensory threshold.

Sulphur dioxide can be readily measured with relatively simple laboratory equipment. There are several methods available; a typical test involves acidification of a sample with phosphoric acid, distillation of the liberated SO_{2}, and capture by hydrogen peroxide solution. The SO_{2} and peroxide react to form sulphuric acid, which is then titrated with NaOH to an end point with an indicator, and the volume of NaOH required is used to calculate the SO_{2} level. This method has inaccuracies associated with red wine, inefficient condensers, and excessive aspiration rate, although the results are reproducible, having an accuracy with just a 2.5–5% error, which is sufficient to control the level of sulphur dioxide in wine.

== Blending and fining ==
Different batches of wine can be mixed before bottling in order to achieve the desired taste. The winemaker can correct perceived inadequacies by mixing wines from different grapes and batches that were produced under different conditions. These adjustments can be as simple as adjusting acid or tannin levels, to as complex as blending different varieties or vintages to achieve a consistent taste.

Fining agents are used during winemaking to remove tannins, reduce astringency and remove microscopic particles that could cloud the wines. The winemakers decide on which fining agents are used and these may vary from product to product and even batch to batch (usually depending on the grapes of that particular year).

Gelatin has been used in winemaking for centuries and is recognized as a traditional method for wine fining, or clarifying. It is also the most commonly used agent to reduce the tannin content. Generally no gelatin remains in the wine because it reacts with the wine components, as it clarifies, and forms a sediment which is removed by filtration prior to bottling.

Besides gelatin, other fining agents for wine are often derived from animal products, such as micronized potassium caseinate (casein is milk protein), egg whites, egg albumin, bone char, bull's blood, isinglass (Sturgeon bladder), PVPP (a synthetic compound), lysozyme, and skim milk powder. Although not common, finely ground eggshell is also sometimes used.

Some aromatized wines contain honey or egg-yolk extract, or other woody extractives by artificial aging with small chips.

Non-animal-based filtering agents are also often used, such as bentonite (a volcanic clay-based filter), diatomaceous earth, cellulose pads, paper filters and membrane filters (thin films of plastic polymer material having uniformly sized holes).

== Preservatives ==
The most common preservative used in winemaking is sulfur dioxide (SO_{2}), normally added in one of the following forms: liquid sulfur dioxide, sodium or potassium metabisulphite. Another useful preservative is potassium sorbate.

Sulfur dioxide has two primary actions, firstly it is an anti microbial agent and secondly an anti oxidant. In the making of white wine it can be added prior to fermentation and immediately after alcoholic fermentation is complete. If added after alcoholic fermentation it will have the effect of preventing or stopping malolactic fermentation, bacterial spoilage and help protect against the damaging effects of oxygen. Additions of up to 100 mg per liter (of sulfur dioxide) can be added, but the available or free sulfur dioxide should be measured by the aspiration method and adjusted to 30 mg per liter. Available sulfur dioxide should be maintained at this level until bottling. For rose wines smaller additions should be made and the available level should be no more than 30 mg per liter.

In the making of red wine, sulfur dioxide may be used at high levels (100 mg per liter) prior to ferment to assist in color stabilization. Otherwise, it is used at the end of malolactic ferment and performs the same functions as in white wine. However, small additions (say, 20 milligrams per litre (7.2×10^{−7} lb/cu in)) should be used to avoid bleaching red pigments and the maintenance level should be about 20 mg/L. Furthermore, small additions (say 20 mg per liter) may be made to red wine after alcoholic ferment and before malolactic ferment to overcome minor oxidation and prevent the growth of acetic acid bacteria.

Without the use of sulfur dioxide, wines can readily suffer bacterial spoilage no matter how hygienic the winemaking practice.

Potassium sorbate is effective for the control of fungal growth, including yeast, especially for sweet wines in bottle. However, one potential hazard is the metabolism of sorbate to geraniol which is a potent and unpleasant by-product. The production of geraniol occurs only if sorbic acid is present during malo-lactic fermentation. To avoid this, either the wine must be sterile bottled or contain enough sulfur dioxide to inhibit the growth of bacteria. Sterile bottling includes the use of filtration.

Some winemakers practice natural wine making where no preservative is added. Once the wine is bottled and corked, the bottles are put into refrigeration with temperatures near 5 °C (41 °F).

== Filtration ==
Filtration in winemaking is used to accomplish two objectives, clarification and microbial stabilization. In clarification, large particles that affect the visual appearance of the wine are removed. In microbial stabilization, organisms that affect the stability of the wine are removed therefore reducing the likelihood of re-fermentation or spoilage.

A wine labelling machine with adhesive labels in France

The process of clarification is concerned with the removal of particles; those larger than 5–10 millimetres (0.20–0.39 in) for coarse polishing, particles larger than 1–4 micrometers for clarifying or polishing. Microbial stabilization requires a filtration of at least 0.65 micrometers for yeast retention and 0.45 μm for bacteria retention. However, filtration at this level may lighten a wine's color and body. Microbial stabilization does not imply sterility, i.e. eliminating (removing) or killing (deactivating) of all forms of life and other biological agents. It simply means that a significant amount of yeast and bacteria has been removed to a harmless level for the wine stability.

Clarification of the wine can take place naturally by putting the wine into refrigeration at 35 °F (2 °C). The wine takes about a month to settle and it is clear. No chemicals are needed.

== Bottling ==
The final stage in the winemaking process is bottling. A final dose of sulfite is added to help preserve the wine and prevent unwanted fermentation in the bottle. The wine bottles are then traditionally sealed with a cork, although alternative wine closures such as less expensive synthetic corks and screw caps, which are less subject to cork taint, are becoming increasingly popular. While natural cork is often favored for its aesthetic and traditional appeal, screw caps are praised for their consistency and ability to reduce oxidation. The final step is adding a capsule to the top of the bottle which is then heated for a tight seal.

Wine bottle closure methods vary greatly considering taste, closure effectiveness, and aesthetic. These methods allow a minimal amount of air in the bottle while allowing the contents to age.

In addition to glass bottles, some wines are packaged in boxes or even cans, which offer practical advantages such as lower cost and reduced weight.

== Regulation ==
In the European Union, wine production is closely regulated to maintain quality, safety, and fair market practices. Each member state is required by Article 146 of Regulation 1308/2013 - Establishing a common organisation of the markets in agricultural products and repealing Council Regulations (EEC) No 922/72, (EEC) No 234/79, (EC) No 1037/2001 and (EC) No 1234/2007 - to appoint one or more "competent national authorities" responsible for ensuring compliance with EU rules in the wine sector. A list of these authorities is maintained by the EU.

In the United States, wine regulation is primarily overseen by the Alcohol and Tobacco Tax and Trade Bureau (TTB), part of the U.S. Department of the Treasury. They are tasked with issuing permits, regulating labeling and advertising, and excise taxes on wine. Furthermore, American Viticultural Areas (AVAs), which are regulated by geographic borders rather than customary production practices or grape varieties designate wine regions in the U.S. Unlike the EU, U.S regulations with wine are more flexible but still strictly enforced.

== Winemakers ==
Traditionally known as a vintner, a winemaker is a person engaged in making wine. They are generally employed by wineries or wine companies, although there are many independent winemakers who make wine at home for their own pleasure or small commercial operation. Additionally, winemaking is still carried in traditional ways by families producing wine for their own consumption.

The world wine export 2020 shows the annual wine export production of various countries.

List of top 15 wine producing countries by volume (in thousands of hectoliters)
| Country | 2010 | 2011 | 2012 | 2013 | 2014 | 2015 | 2016 | 2017 | 2018 |
|---|---|---|---|---|---|---|---|---|---|
| Italy | 48,525 | 42,772 | 45,616 | 52,029 | 44,739 | 50,000 | 50,900 | 42,500 | 48,500 |
| France | 44,381 | 50,757 | 41,548 | 42,004 | 46,698 | 47,000 | 45,200 | 36,600 | 46,400 |
| Spain | 35,353 | 33,397 | 31,123 | 45,650 | 41,620 | 37,700 | 39,300 | 32,500 | 40,900 |
| United States | 20,887 | 19,140 | 21,650 | 23,590 | 22,300 | 21,700 | 23,600 | 23,300 | 23,900 |
| Argentina | 16,250 | 15,473 | 11,778 | 14,984 | 15,197 | 13,400 | 9,400 | 11,800 | 14,500 |
| Australia | 11,420 | 11,180 | 12,260 | 12,500 | 12,000 | 11,900 | 13,100 | 13,900 | 12,500 |
| South Africa | 9,327 | 9,725 | 10,569 | 10,982 | 11,316 | 11,200 | 10,500 | 10,800 | 9,500 |
| China | 13,000 | 13,200 | 13,511 | 11,780 | 11,178 | 11,500 | 11,400 | 11,400 | 10,800 |
| Chile | 8,844 | 10,464 | 12,554 | 12,820 | 10,500 | 12,900 | 10,100 | 9,500 | 12,900 |
| Germany | 6,906 | 9,132 | 9,012 | 8,409 | 9,334 | 8,900 | 9,000 | 7,500 | 9,800 |
| Portugal | 7,148 | 5,622 | 6,308 | 6,237 | 6,195 | 7,000 | 6,000 | 6,700 | 5,300 |
| Romania | 3,287 | 4,058 | 3,311 | 5,100 | 3,700 | 3,600 | 3,300 | 4,300 | 5,200 |
| Russian Federation | 6,400 | 6,353 | 6,400 | 5,300 | 4,900 | 5,600 | 5,200 | 4,700 | 4,700 |
| Hungary | - | - | - | 2,600 | 2,400 | 2,600 | 2,500 | 2,500 | 3,400 |
| Rest of the world | 27,847 | 30,906 | 27,194 | 31,000 | 27,100 | 29,800 | 29,900 | 30,900 | 30,700 |
| World | 264,425 | 267,279 | 257,889 | 290,100 | 270,000 | 277,000 | 273,000 | 251,000 | 282,000 |

== See also ==
- Winery
- Acids in wine
- Glossary of wine terms
- Governo
- History of wine
- Homebrewing
- List of wine-producing countries
- Sugars in wine
