= Protein adsorption in the food industry =

Adhesion of food proteins to surfaces

Protein adsorption refers to the adhesion of proteins to solid surfaces. This phenomenon is an important issue in the food processing industry, particularly in milk processing and wine and beer making. Excessive adsorption, or protein fouling, can lead to health and sanitation issues, as the adsorbed protein is very difficult to clean and can harbor bacteria, as is the case in biofilms. Product quality can be adversely affected if the adsorbed material interferes with processing steps, like pasteurization. However, in some cases protein adsorption is used to improve food quality, as is the case in fining of wines.

== Protein adsorption ==
Protein adsorption and protein fouling can cause major problems in the food industry (particularly the dairy industry) when proteins from food adsorb to processing surfaces, such as stainless steel or plastic (e.g. polypropylene). Protein fouling is the gathering of protein aggregates on a surface. This is most common in heating processes that create a temperature gradient between the equipment and the bulk substance being heated. In protein-fouled heating equipment, adsorbed proteins can create an insulating layer between the heater and the bulk material, reducing heating efficiency. This leads to inefficient sterilization and pasteurization. Also, proteins stuck to the heater may cause a burned taste or color in the bulk material. Additionally, in processes that employ filtration, protein aggregates that gather on the surface of the filter can block the flow of the bulk material and greatly reduce filter efficiency.

== Examples of adsorption ==
=== Beer stone ===
Beerstone is a buildup that forms when oxalate, proteins, and calcium or magnesium salts from the grains and water in the beer brewing process precipitate and form scale on kegs, barrels and tap lines. The minerals adsorb to the surface of the container first, driven by charge attractions. Proteins are often coordinated to these minerals in the solution and can bind with them to the surface. In other cases proteins also adsorb to the minerals on the surface, making deposits difficult to remove, as well as providing a surface that can easily harbor microorganisms. If built-up beer stone inside tap lines flakes off, it can negatively affect the quality of the finished product by making beer hazy and contributing "off" flavors. It is also harmful from a nutritional standpoint: oxalates can decrease absorption of calcium in the body, in addition to increasing risk of kidney stone formation.

=== Wine making ===
Grape and wine proteins tend to aggregate and form hazes and sediment in finished wines, especially white wines. Haze-causing proteins can persist in wine due to low settling velocities or charge repulsion on individual particles. Fining agents, such as bentonite clays, are used to clarify wine by removing these proteins. Also, proteinaceous agents such as albumin, casein, or gelatin are used in wine clarification to remove tannins or other phenols.

=== Biofilms ===
A biofilm is a community of microorganisms adsorbed to a surface. Microorganisms in biofilms are enclosed in a polymeric matrix consisting of exopolysaccharides, extracellular DNA and proteins. Seconds after a surface (usually metal) is placed in a solution, inorganic and organic molecules adsorb onto the surface. These molecules are attracted mainly by Coulombic forces (see above section), and can adhere very strongly to the surface. This first layer is called the conditioning layer, and is necessary for the microorganisms to bind to the surface. These microorganisms then attach reversibly by Van der Waals forces, followed by irreversible adhesion through self-produced attachment structures such as pili or flagella. Biofilms form on solid substrates such as stainless steel. A biofilm's enclosing polymeric matrix offers protection to its microbes, increasing their resistance to detergents and cleaning agents. Biofilms on food processing surfaces can be a biological hazard to food safety. Increased chemical resistance in biofilms can lead to a persistent contamination condition.

=== Dairy industry ===
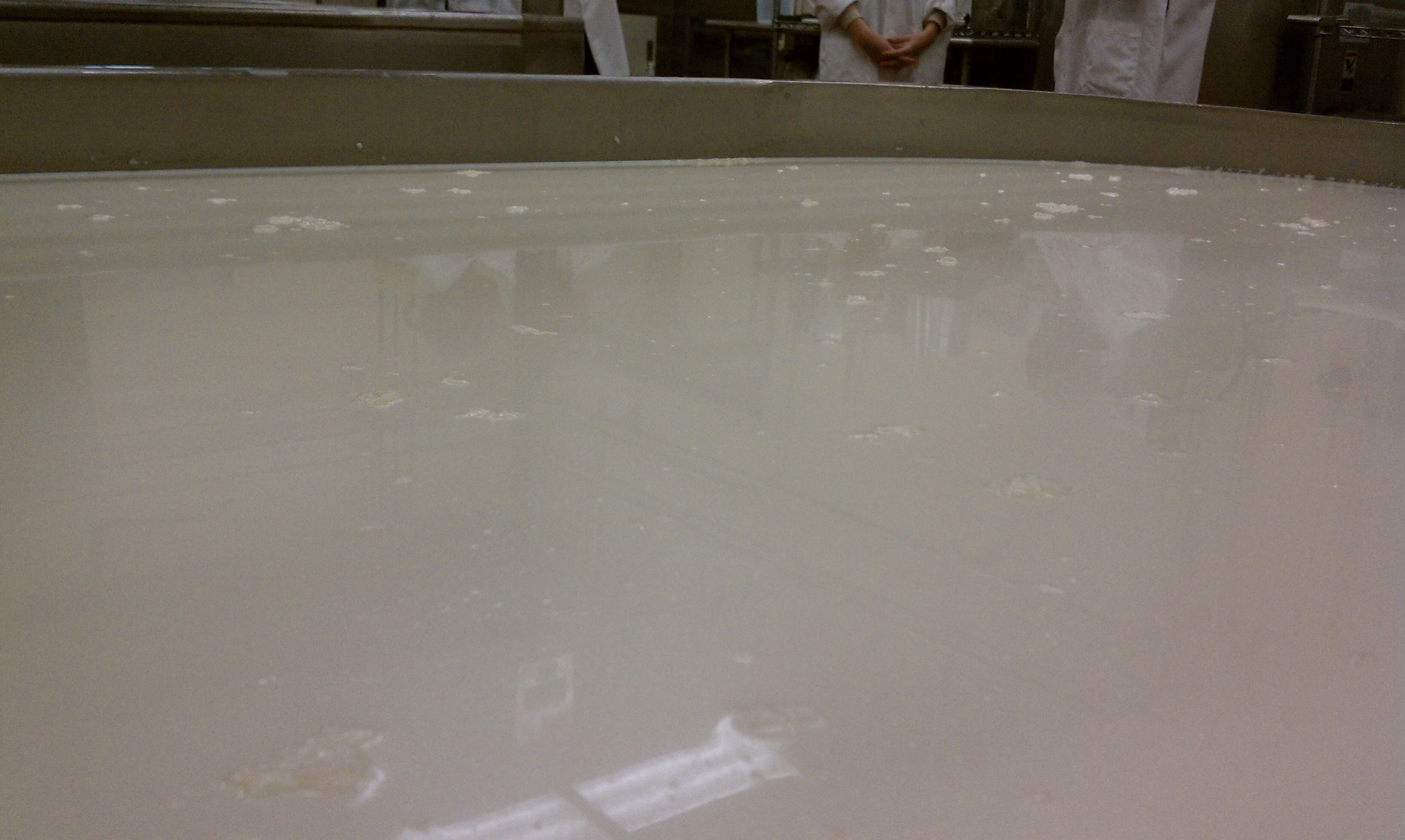
Pasteurized milk being held in bulk heating tank for cheese making.

Thermal treatment of milk by indirect heating (e.g. pasteurization) to reduce microbial load and increase shelf life is generally performed by a plate heat exchanger. Heat exchanger surfaces can become fouled by adsorbed milk protein deposits. Fouling is initiated by formation of a protein monolayer at room temperature, followed by heat induced aggregation and deposition of whey protein and calcium phosphate deposits. Adsorbed proteins decrease efficiency of heat transfer and potentially affect product quality by preventing adequate heating of milk.

== Mechanisms for protein adsorption ==
The common trend in all examples of protein adsorption in the food industry is that of adsorption to minerals adsorbed to the surface first. This phenomenon has been studied but it is not well understood. Spectroscopy of proteins adsorbed onto clay-like minerals show variations in the C=O and N-H bond stretches, meaning that these bonds are involved in the protein binding.

=== Coulombic ===
In some cases proteins are attracted to surfaces by an excessive surface charge. When a surface in a fluid has a net charge, ions in the fluid will adsorb to the surface. Proteins also have charged surfaces due to charge amino acid residues on the surface of the protein. The surface and the protein are then attracted by Coulombic forces.

The attraction a protein feels from a charged surface ($\phi$) depends exponentially on the surface's charge, as described by the following formula:

$$\phi=\phi_0 e^{\frac{-x}{\lambda_D}}$$

Where

- $\phi$ is the potential felt by the protein
- $\phi_0$ is the actual potential of the surface
- $x$ is the distance from the protein to the surface, and
- $\lambda_D$ is the Debye length.

A protein's surface's potential is given by the number of charged amino acids it has and its isoelectric point, pI.

=== Thermodynamic ===
Protein adsorption can also occur as a direct result of heating a mixture. Protein adsorption in milk processing is often used as a model for this type of adsorption in other situations. Milk is composed mainly of water, with less than 20% of suspended solids or dissolved proteins. Proteins make up only 3.6% of milk in total, and only 26% of the components that are not water. These proteins are all responsible for fouling that occurs during pasteurization.

Composition of solids (non-water elements) in milk

As milk is heated during pasteurization many of the proteins in the milk are denatured. Pasteurization temperatures can reach 161 °F (71.7 °C). This temperature is high enough to denature the proteins below, lowering the nutritional value of the milk and causing fouling. Milk is heated to these high temperatures for a short time (15–20 seconds) to reduce the amount of denaturization. However fouling from denatured proteins is still a significant problem.

Protein	ΔH	Denaturization Temperature (K)	Tm (C)
β-Lactoglobulin	599±19	344.0	70.85
α-Lactalbumin	184±11	312.7	39.55
BSA	799±44	334.3	61.15

Denaturation exposes hydrophobic amino acid residues in the protein, which had been previously protected by the protein. The exposed hydrophobic amino acids decrease the entropy of the water surrounding them, making it favorable for surface adsorption. Some of the β-lactoglobulin (β-lg) will adsorb directly onto the surface of a heat exchanger or container. Other denatured β-lg molecules adsorb to casein micelles, which are also present in the milk. As more and more β-lg proteins bind to the casein micelle it forms an aggregate, which will then diffuse to the heat exchanger and/or surface of the container.

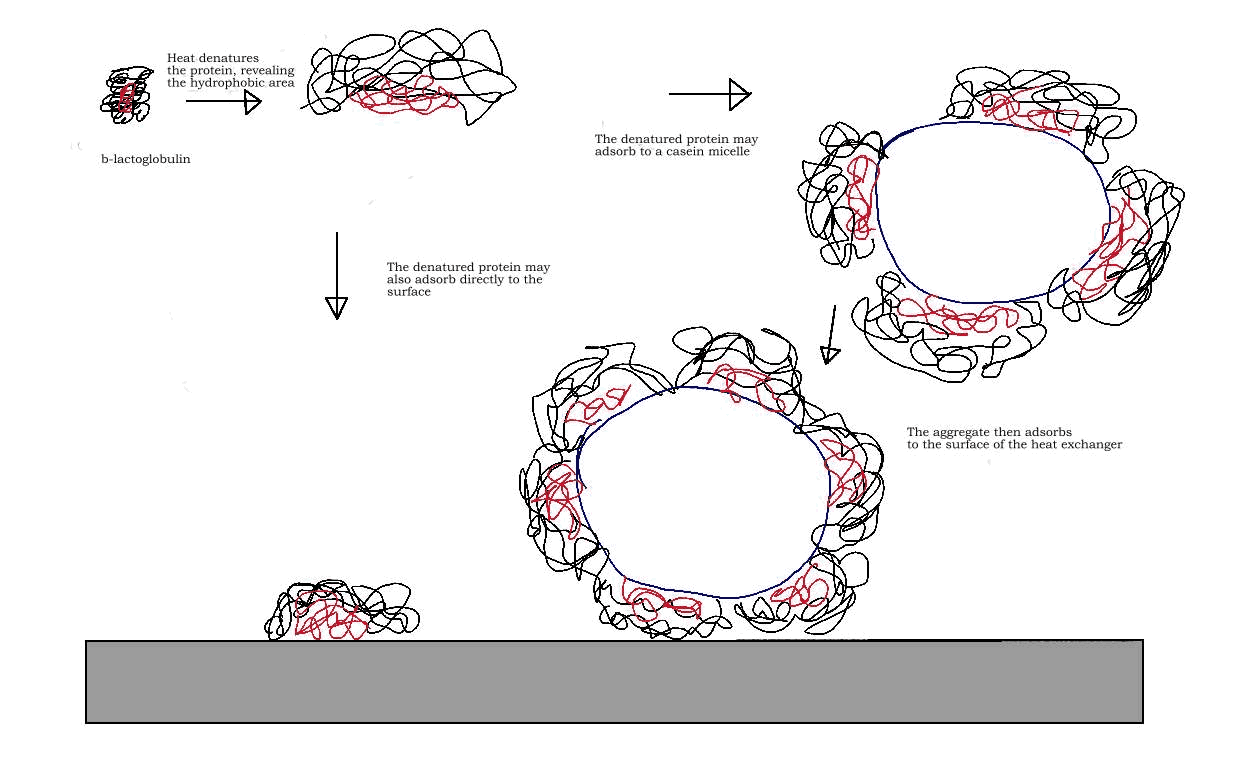
Mechanism of denaturing protein adsorption

=== Biochemical ===
While the aggregates can explain much of the protein fouling found in milk processing, this does not account for it all. A third type of fouling has been discovered that is explained by the chemical interactions of the denatured β-lg proteins.

β-lg contains 5 cysteine residues, four of which are covalently bonded to each other, forming an S-S bond. When β-lg is denatured, the fifth cysteine residue is exposed to the water. This residue then bonds to other β-lg proteins, including those already adsorbed to the surface. This produces a strong interaction between the denatured proteins and the surface of the container.

== Isotherms ==
Isotherms are used to quantify the amount of adsorbed protein on a surface at a constant temperature, depending on the concentration of protein above the surface. Researchers have used a Langmuir-type isotherm model to describe experimental values for protein adsorption.

$$\Gamma=\frac{V_pC_e}{A_pe^{\frac{W_aA_c}{RT}+V_pC_e}}$$

In this equation

- $\Gamma$ is the amount of adsorbed protein
- $A_c$ is the surface area per molecule
- $V_p$ is the partial molar volume of protein
- $W_a$ is the negative of the Gibbs Free Energy of adsorption per unit area and
- $C_e$ is the equilibrium protein concentration.

This equation has been applied to a laboratory setting of protein adsorption at temperatures higher than 50 °C from a model solution of protein and water. It is especially useful for modeling protein fouling in milk processing.

== Removal of adsorbed proteins ==
Adsorbed proteins are among the most difficult food soils to remove from food contact surfaces. In particular, heat-denatured proteins (such as those found in dairy industry applications) adhere tightly to surfaces and require strong alkaline cleaners for removal. It is important that cleaning methods are capable of removing both visible and non-visible protein soils. Nutrients for bacterial growth must be removed as well as biofilms that may have built up on the food contact surface. Proteins are water-insoluble, slightly soluble in acidic solutions and soluble in alkaline solutions, which limits the type of cleaner that can be used to remove protein from the surface. Generally speaking, highly alkaline cleaners with peptizing and wetting agents are most effective in protein removal on food contact surfaces. Cleaning temperature is also a concern for effective protein removal. As temperature increases, the activity of the cleaning compound increases, making soil removal easier. However, at higher temperatures (> 55 °C) proteins denature and cleaning efficacy is reduced.

=== Alkaline cleaners ===
Alkaline cleaners are classified as compounds with pH 7-14. Proteins are most effectively removed from surfaces by cleaners with a pH of 11 or higher. An example of a strong alkaline cleaning agent is sodium hydroxide, also called caustic soda. Although sodium hydroxide (NaOH) can cause corrosion on food contact surfaces such as stainless steel, it is the preferred cleaning agent for protein removal due to its efficacy in dissolving proteins and dispersing/emulsifying food soils. Silicates are often added to these cleaners to reduce corrosion on metal surfaces. The mechanism of alkaline cleaning action in proteins follows a three-step process:

1. Gel formation: Upon contact with the alkaline solution, the protein soil swells and forms a removable gel.
2. Protein removal: The protein gel is removed through mass transfer, while the cleaning agent continues to diffuse through the soil, increasing gel formation.
3. Decay stage: The protein gel has been eroded to the point where it is a thin deposit. Removal at this stage is governed by shear stress forces and mass transfer of the gel.

Hypochlorite is often added to alkaline cleaners to peptize proteins. Chlorinated cleansers work by oxidizing sulfide crosslinks in proteins. Cleaning speed and efficiency is improved due to increased diffusion of the cleaner into the soil matrix, now composed of smaller, more soluble proteins.

=== Enzyme cleaners ===
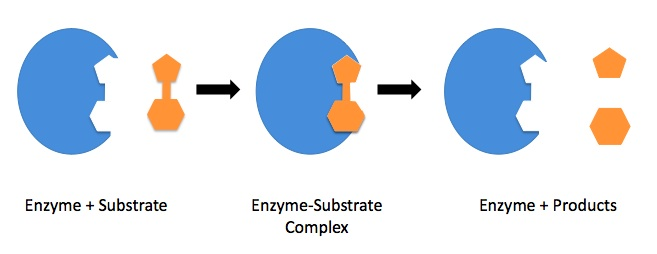
Basic mechanism of enzyme action

Enzyme-based cleaners are especially useful for biofilm removal. Bacteria are somewhat difficult to remove with traditional alkaline or acid cleaners. Enzyme cleaners are more effective on biofilms since they work as proteases by breaking down proteins at bacterial attachment sites. They work at maximum efficiency at high pH and at temperatures below 60 °C. Enzyme cleaners are an increasingly attractive alternative to traditional chemical cleaners because of biodegradability and other environmental factors, such as reduced wastewater generation and energy savings from using cold water. However, they are typically more expensive than alkaline or acid cleaners.
