= Vegetarianism and beer =

Concerns about the use of animal products in beermaking

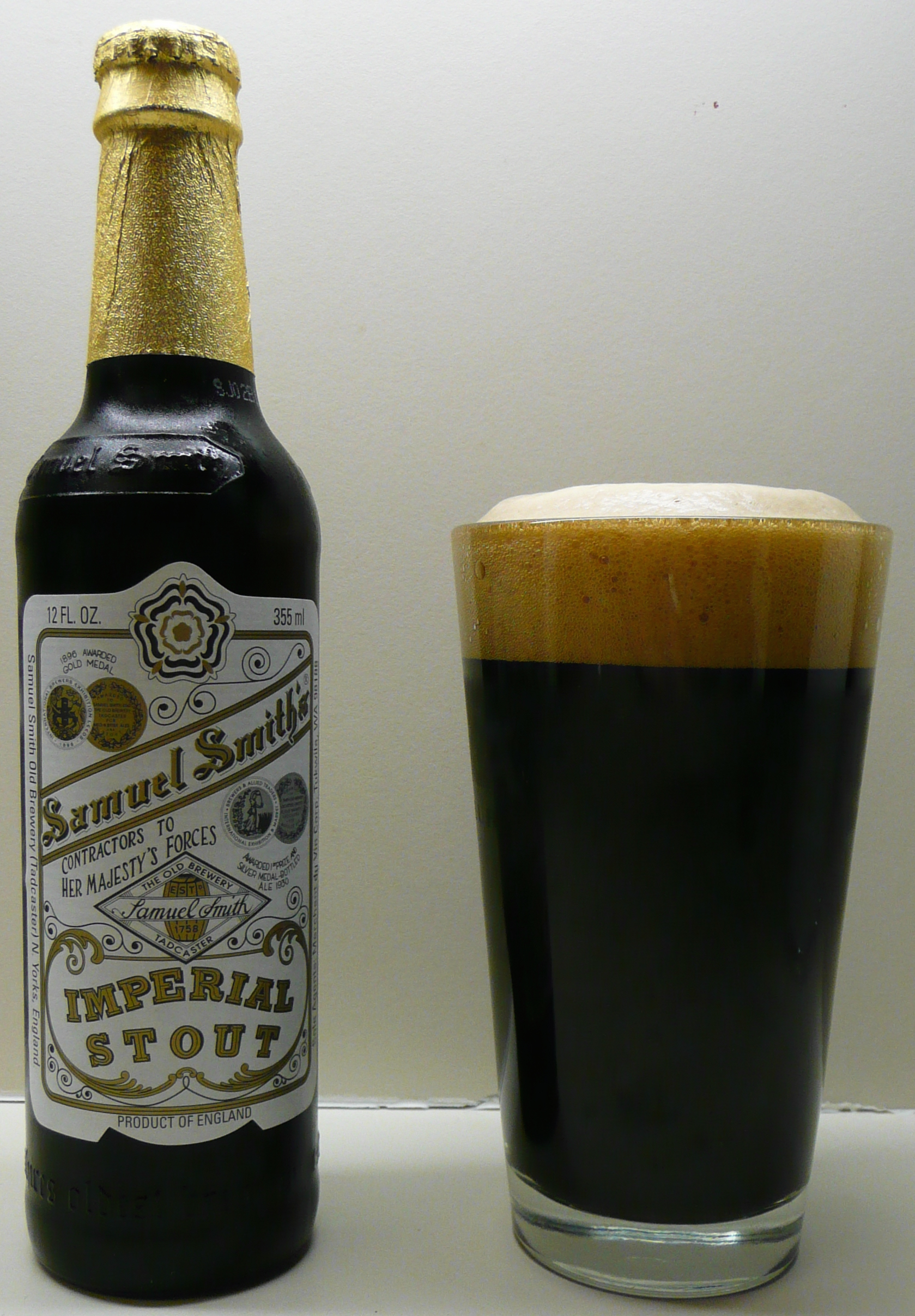
Samuel Smith Old Brewery's Imperial Stout – a vegetarian beer

Beer is often made from barley malt, water, hops and yeast and so is often suitable for vegans and vegetarians. Some beer brewers add finings to clarify the beer when racking into a barrel. Finings can include plant-derived products, like Irish moss, or animal-derived products, like isinglass and gelatin.

Most breweries do not reveal if they do or do not use animal products in the processing of their beers; some exceptions are Samuel Smith, Heineken, Harp Lager, Anheuser-Busch, the Marble Brewery in Manchester, the Black Isle Brewery, and Black Sheep Brewery, all of whom have declared they make vegetarian and/or vegan beer.

== Ingredients and additives unsuitable for vegetarians and vegans ==
=== Finings ===
The British writer Roger Protz says that beer glassware only became popular in the 19th century, and that British cask ale is traditionally served unfiltered.

Most beer is filtered without the need for animal products, and so remains vegetarian; however British cask ale producers do not filter the beer at the end of the production process. When beer is left unfiltered, the yeast that fermented the wort, and turned the sugar in the barley into alcohol, remains in suspension in the liquid. The yeast that remains suspended in the beer creates a cloudy appearance, and can have a yeasty flavour. Finings are used to clear the beer of yeast – there are a variety of agents used as finings, including silicon dioxide, gelatin, polyclar, and isinglass.

Isinglass is the most common fining used to clear cask ale. Isinglass is produced from the swim bladders of fish, usually sturgeon, though also those in the polynemidae, sciaenidae and siluridae families; as it is an animal product, cask ale cleared with isinglass is not considered vegetarian.

=== Glycerol monostearate ===
A brewer may also use some form of animal product in the later stages of beer processing, such as glycerol monostearate, which is used to create a foam or head on the finished beer.

=== Honey ===
Honey is added to some beers as an adjunct, for flavouring and to sweeten the beer. Though generally considered suitable for vegetarians, honey is an animal product, so is not suitable for vegans.

=== Lactose ===
Some beers, particularly milk stouts, contain lactose, a sugar derived from milk, and are thus not suitable for people who abstain from eating dairy products.

== Packaged beers ==
Other than bottle conditioned, beers which are packaged in cans, bottles or kegs are filtered in some form, either pasteurised or cold-filtered. In general filtering does not require the use of finings, though animal finings may be used on some batches that are too hazy to be cleared easily by the regular filtering methods.

== Vegetarian breweries ==
Even though many beers are vegetarian, most brewers do not reveal which beers contain animal products. Those brewers who have published this information include Bartleby's Brewery, Samuel Smith, Anheuser-Busch, MillerCoors, the Marble Brewery in Manchester, UK, the Black Isle Brewery, Little Valley Brewery, the Pitfield Brewery, Black Sheep Brewery. the Epic Brewing Company, and Broken Compass Brewing Company.

Guinness opened a new filtration plant in 2016 that made their beer vegan-friendly which was expanded in 2017 to include all Guinness (i.e. all draught, bottle and can forms).

== See also ==
- Vegetarianism and wine
