= Clarification and stabilization of wine =

Wine clarification and stabilisation

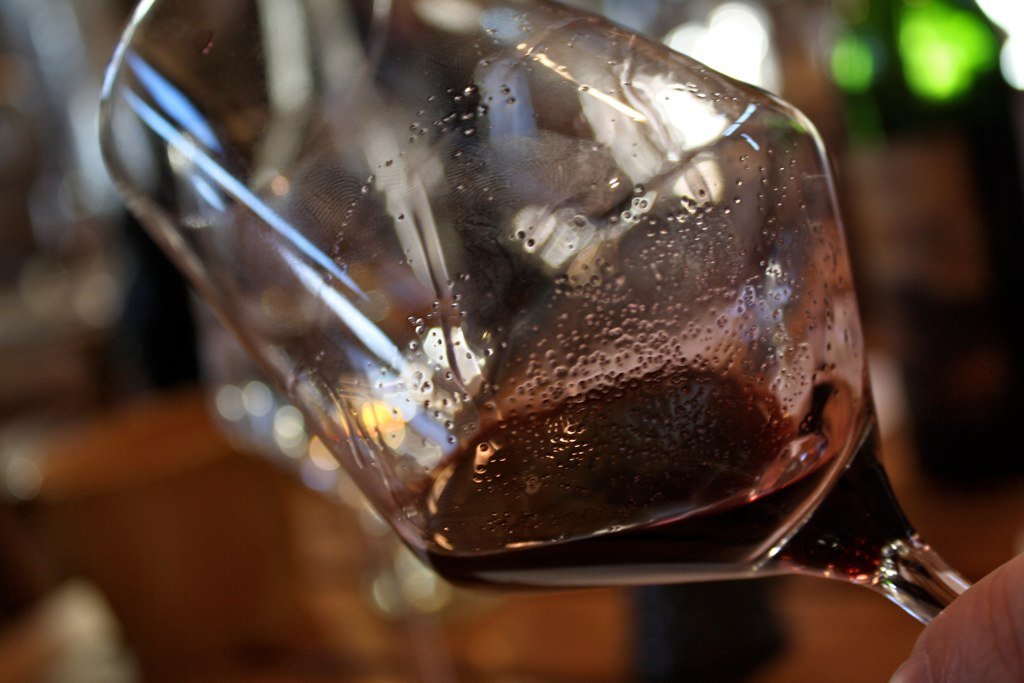
The winemaking process naturally produces sediments that can precipitate out of the wine.

In winemaking, clarification and stabilization are the processes by which insoluble matter suspended in the wine is removed before bottling. This matter may include dead yeast cells (lees), bacteria, tartrates, proteins, pectins, various tannins and other phenolic compounds, as well as pieces of grape skin, pulp, stems and gums. Clarification and stabilization may involve fining, filtration, centrifugation, flotation, refrigeration, pasteurization, and/or barrel maturation and racking.

== Clarifying wine ==
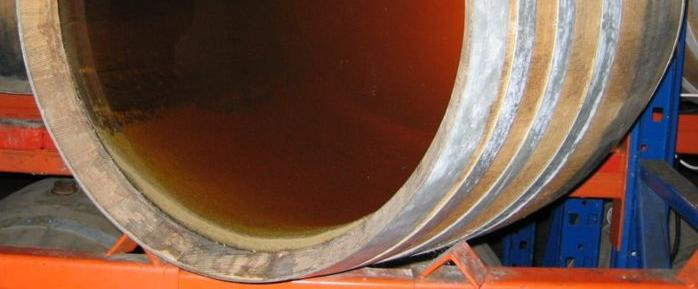
Natural clarification takes place as wine ages in barrel, its suspended particles gradually falling to the bottom.

In wine tasting, a wine is considered "clear" when there are no visible particles suspended in the liquid and, especially in the case of white wines, when there is some degree of transparency. A wine with too much suspended matter will appear cloudy and dull, even if its aroma and flavor are unaffected; wines therefore generally undergo some kind of clarification.

Before fermentation, pectin-splitting enzymes and, for white wine, fining agents such as bentonite may be added to the must in order to promote the eventual agglomeration and settling of colloids. Pectins are structural molecules in the cell walls of fruits which have the important function of 'gumming' plant cells together. The pectin content of grapes increases steadily throughout ripening, reaching levels of about 1 g/L, although it varies by varietal and pre-fermentation handling processes. Large pectin molecules can affect the amount of juice yielded at pressing, ease of filtration and clarification, and extraction of tannins. Grapes contain natural pectolytic enzymes responsible for softening the grape berries during ripening, but these are not active under wine-making conditions (due to pH level, SO_{2}, and alcohol.) Therefore, fungal pectolytic enzymes are often added to white must to break up pectins, decrease the viscosity of the juice, and speed up settling. In red musts, this increases color and tannin extraction.

After fermentation, the force of gravity may eventually cause the wine to "fall bright" or clarify naturally, as the larger suspended particles gradually settle to the bottom of the storage vessel. The wine can then be siphoned or "racked" off the compact solids into a new container. But this process may take many months, or even years, as well as several rackings, in order to produce a perfectly clear wine. Producers can accelerate the process by using fining agents, filtration and/or flotation.

=== Fining ===
In winemaking, fining is the process by which a substance (fining agent) is added to the wine to create an adsorbent, enzymatic or ionic bond with the suspended particles, producing larger molecules and larger particles that will precipitate out of the wine more readily and rapidly. Unlike filtration, which can only remove particulates (such as dead yeast cells and grape fragments), fining can remove soluble substances such as polymerized tannins, coloring phenols and proteins; some of these proteins can cause haziness in wines exposed to high temperatures after bottling. The reduction of tannin can reduce astringency in red wines. Many substances have historically been used as fining agents, including dried blood powder. There are two general types of fining agents — organic compounds and solid/mineral materials.

Organic compounds used as fining agents are generally animal based, a possible cause of concern to vegans. The most common organic compounds used include egg whites, casein derived from milk, gelatin and isinglass obtained from the bladders of fish. Pulverized minerals and solid materials can also be used, with bentonite clay being one of the most common, thanks to its effectiveness in absorbing proteins and some bacteria. Activated carbon from charcoal is used to remove some phenols that contribute to browning as well as some particles that produce "off-odors" in the wine. In a process known as blue fining, potassium ferrocyanide is sometimes used to remove any copper and iron particles that have entered the wine from bentonite, metal winery and vineyard equipment, or vineyard sprays such as Bordeaux mixture. Because potassium ferrocyanide may form hydrogen cyanide its use is highly regulated and, in many wine producing countries, illegal. Silica and kaolin are also sometimes used.

Some countries, such as Australia and New Zealand, have wine labeling laws that require the use of fining agents that may be an allergenic substance to appear on the wine label. A study conducted by the University of California, Davis Department of Viticulture and Enology, however, found that no detectable amount of inorganic fining agents, and only trace quantities of proteinaceous agents, are left in the wine.

There is the risk of valuable aromatic molecules being precipitated out along with the less desirable matter. Some producers of premium wine avoid fining, or delay it in order to leach more flavor and aroma from the phenols before they are removed.

=== Filtration ===
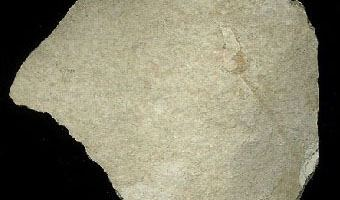
Diatomaceous earth, often used in depth filtration

While fining clarifies wine by binding to suspended particles and precipitating out as larger particles, filtration works by passing the wine through a filter medium that captures particles larger than the medium's holes. Complete filtration may require a series of filtering through progressively finer filters. Many white wines require the removal of all potentially active yeast and/or lactic acid bacteria if they are to remain reliably stable in bottle, and this is usually achieved by fine filtration.

Most filtration in a winery can be classified as either the coarser depth filtration or the finer surface filtration. In depth filtration, often done after fermentation, the wine is pushed through a thick layer of pads made from cellulose fibers, diatomaceous earth, or perlite. In surface filtration, the wine passes through a thin membrane. Running the wine parallel to the filter surface, known as cross-flow filtration, will minimize the filter clogging. The finest surface filtration, microfiltration, can sterilize the wine by trapping all yeast and, optionally, bacteria, and so is often done immediately prior to bottling. An absolute rated filter of 0.45 μm is generally considered to result in a microbially stable wine and is accomplished by the use of membrane cartridges, most commonly polyvinylidene fluoride (PVDF). Certain red wines may be filtered to 0.65 μm, to remove yeast, or to 1.0 μm to remove viable brettanomyces only.

=== Flotation ===
The winemaking technique of flotation was adapted from the froth flotation process used in the mining industry for ore refining. In this process, small bubbles of air (or compressed nitrogen) are injected into the bottom of a tank. As the bubbles rise through the must, grape solids, including phenolic compounds prone to oxidation and browning, will tend to cling to the bubbles, creating a froth that can be removed from the wine. This must be done prior to fermentation, since yeast will inhibit the flocculation involved.

== Stabilization ==
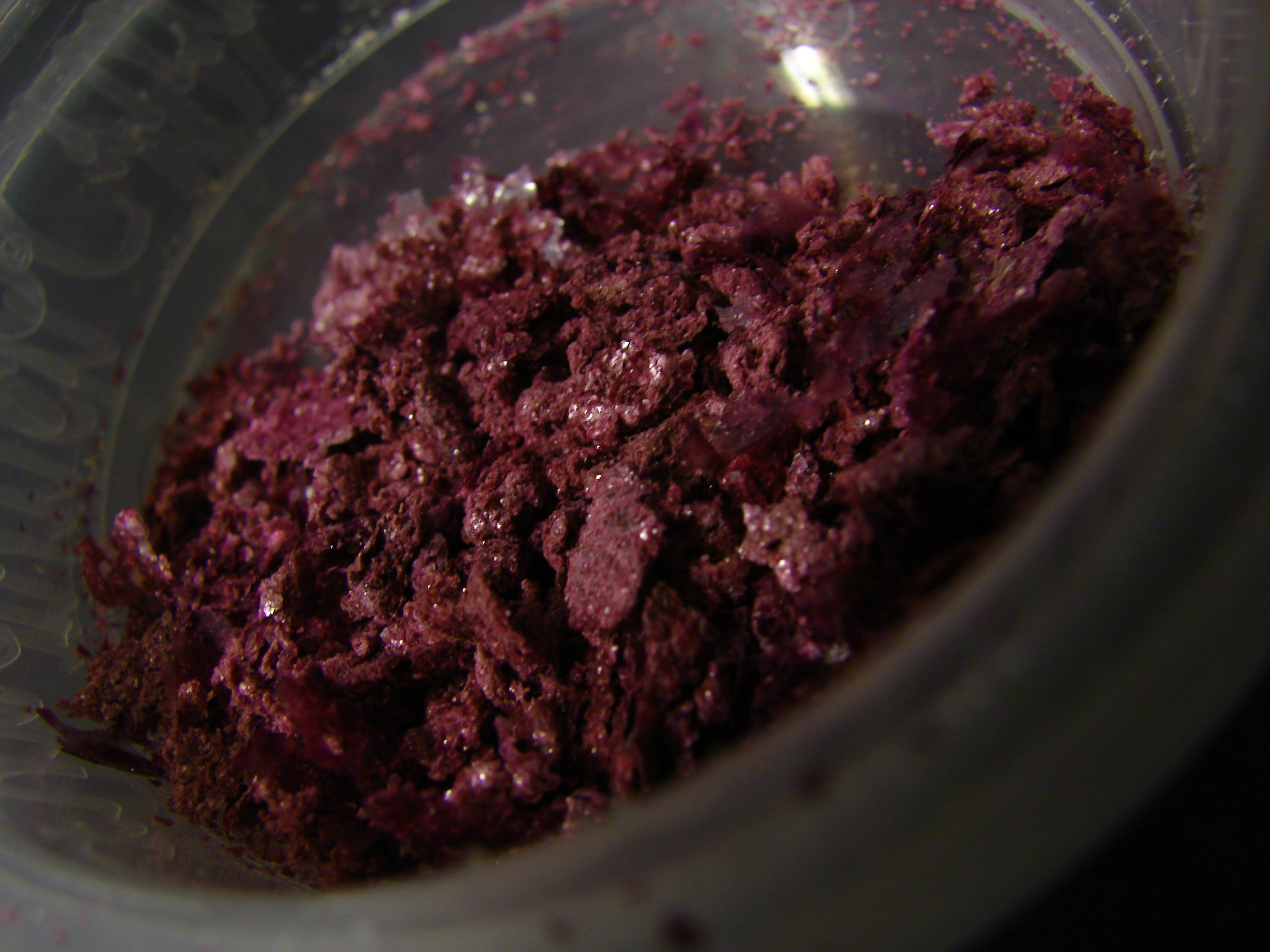
Cold stabilization causes tartrates to crystallize and precipitate out of the wine.

As a complex chemical mixture dependent on the activity of microorganisms, wine can be unstable and reactive to changes in its environment. Once bottled, a wine may be exposed to extremes of temperature and humidity, as well as violent movement during transportation and storage. These may cause cloudiness, sedimentation and/or the formation of tartrate crystals; more seriously, they may also cause spoilage or the production of carbonic gas.

=== Temperature instability ===
Tartaric acid is the most prominent acid in wine with the majority of the concentration present as potassium bitartrate. During fermentation, these tartrates bind with the lees, pulp debris and precipitated tannins and pigments. While there is some variation according to grape variety and climate, usually about half of the deposits are soluble in the wine, but on exposure to low temperature they may crystallize out unpredictably. The crystals, though harmless, may be mistaken for broken glass, or simply reckoned unattractive by consumers. To prevent this the wine may undergo "cold stabilization", in which it is cooled to near its freezing point to provoke crystallization before bottling. In some white wines there are significant quantities of proteins that, being "heat-unstable", will coagulate if exposed to excessively fluctuating heat; the use of fining agents such as bentonite can prevent the haze this causes.

=== Microbiological instability ===
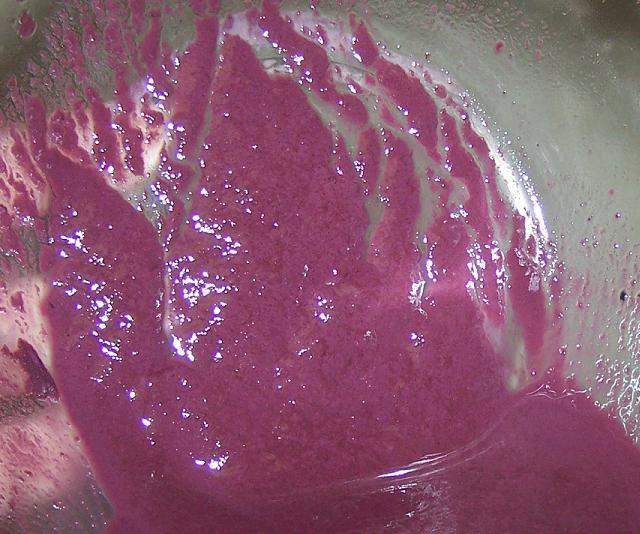
Dead yeast cells can leave wine cloudy, while active yeast may trigger further fermentation.

A wine that has not been sterilized by filtration might well still contain live yeast cells and bacteria. If both alcoholic and malolactic fermentation have run to completion, and neither excessive oxygen nor Brettanomyces yeast are present, this ought to cause no problems; modern hygiene has largely eliminated spoilage by bacteria such as acetobacter, which turns wine into vinegar. If there is residual sugar, however, it may undergo secondary fermentation, creating dissolved carbon dioxide as a by-product. When the wine is opened, it will be spritzy or "sparkling". In a wine intended to be still this is regarded as a serious fault; it can even cause the bottle to explode. Similarly, a wine that has not been put through complete malolactic fermentation may undergo it in bottle, reducing its acidity, generating carbon dioxide, and adding a diacetyl butterscotch aroma. Brettanomyces yeasts add 4-ethylphenol, 4-ethylguaiacol and isovaleric acid horse-sweat aromas. These phenomena may be prevented by sterile filtration, by the addition of relatively large quantities of sulfur dioxide and sometimes sorbic acid, by mixing in alcoholic spirit to give a fortified wine of sufficient strength to kill all yeast and bacteria, or by pasteurization.

Pasteurization gives a kosher wine of the type called mevushal, literally "cooked" or "boiled", that can be handled by non-Jews and non-observant Jews without losing its kosher status. Typically, the wine is heated to 185 °F (85 °C) for a minute, then cooled to 122 °F (50 °C), at which temperature it remains for up to three days, killing all yeast and bacteria. It may then be allowed to cool, or be bottled "hot" and cooled by water sprays. Since pasteurization affects a wine's flavor and aging potential it is not used for premium wines. A gentler procedure known as flash pasteurization involves heating to 205 °F (96 °C) for a few seconds, followed by rapid cooling.

=== Other methods of stabilization ===
Clarification tends to stabilize wine, since it removes some of the same particles that promote instability. The gradual oxidation that occurs during barrel aging also has a naturally stabilizing effect.

== Premium wine production ==
Some producers prefer not to thoroughly clarify and stabilize their wines, believing that the processes involved may diminish a wine's aroma, flavor, texture, color or aging potential. Wine experts such as Tom Stevenson note that they may improve wine quality when used with moderation and care, or diminish it when used to excess. Winemakers deliberately leave more tartrates and phenolics in wines designed for long aging in bottle so that they are able to develop the aromatic compounds that constitute bouquet. The consumers of some wines, such as red Bordeaux and Port, may expect to see tartrates and sediment after aging in bottle.
