= Fierce (disambiguation) =

Fierce is a British R&B group.

Fierce may also refer to:

- Fierce (fragrance), a men's fragrance made by Abercrombie & Fitch
- Fierce Beer, a brewery and pub chain based in Aberdeen, Scotland

== Entertainment ==
- Fierce!, an international performance festival in Birmingham, UK
- FierceBiotech, FierceHealthcare, etc., trade magazines published by Questex
- Jaidynn Diore Fierce, American drag queen
- Robin Fierce, American drag queen
- "Fierce", a song by Azealia Banks from the 2012 mixtape Fantasea
