= Proteins in wine =

Proteins are present in wine. The most common proteins include thaumatin-like proteins and chitinases and have a role in the formation of turbidity (haze) especially visible in white wine. The quantity of haze forming is dependent on the quantity of phenolics in the wine.

Some of those proteins are considered nuisance. Some of them are grape pathogenesis-related proteins. Those proteins have been identified by mass spectrometry and originate from grape, yeast, bacteria and fungi.

These proteins are unstable when submitted to heat, and can be removed by treatment using bentonite, a process that contributes to the clarification and stabilization of wine.

Proteins residues from proteinaceous fining agents such as gelatin or egg white can possibly be found in wine. Wheat gluten has also been tested, but there are health issues regarding its use because of gluten intolerance in some people.

== See also ==
- Wine chemistry
- Protein adsorption in the food industry
