= Fierce Beer =

Scottish brewery

- Type: Limited company
- Founded: 2015
- Headquarters: Aberdeen, United Kingdom
- Website: fiercebeer.com

Fierce Beer Limited is a brewery and pub chain based in Aberdeen, Scotland.

== History ==
Fierce Beer was founded in 2015 in Dyce, Aberdeen by Dave Grant and David McHardy, who both previously worked in the oil industry, It started production in May 2016 and, by July, it had made over 20,000 litres.

In September 2017, Fierce announced its intention to expand its brewing operations following a £400,000 investment from Southern Cross Beverages, for which they gained 20% ownership of the brewery in equity.

The company opened a bar on Rose Street, Edinburgh in May 2019.

Fierce opened a bar in Manchester's Northern Quarter in September 2020. It closed in December 2024.

== Partnerships ==
In 2022, Fierce started selling Indian Lager and Citrus Pale Ale in partnership with the celebrity chef Tony Singh, who described "a gap in the market for a range of premium beers with a distinctly Indian twist that are great on their own but could also complement curries".

On 7 September 2024, the brewer and the Aberdeen Lynx ice hockey team introduced a vegan and gluten-free pale lager called Slapshot.

In September 2024, Fierce introduced 1983 Aberdeen Lager along with a non-alcoholic variant in association with Aberdeen F.C., followed by Wasp Stout in October. The drinks were reintroduced in May 2025 to celebrate the team's progression to the 2025 Scottish Cup final.
