= PEG-PVA =

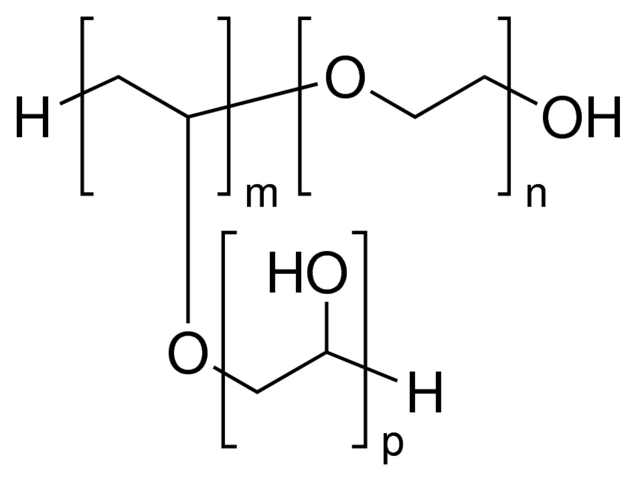

Identifiers
CAS Number	96734-39-3
CompTox Dashboard (EPA)	DTXSID901011560

Properties
Chemical formula	(C_{2}H_{4}O)_{m}-(C_{2}H_{4}O)_{n}-(C_{2}H_{4}O)_{p}
Molar mass	Variable
Solubility in water	>30%
Solubility in organic solvents	Insoluble
- Except where otherwise noted, data are given for materials in their standard state (at 25 °C [77 °F], 100 kPa). Infobox references

Polyethylene glycol–polyvinyl alcohol (PEG-PVA) brand name Kollicoat IR (BASF) is a multifunctional excipient used as a pill binder as well as a wet binder.

A typical formulation is composed of 25% polyethylene glycol (PEG) and 75% polyvinyl alcohol (PVA); where the vinyl alcohol moieties are grafted on a polyethylene glycol backbone.

== See also ==
- Dendronized polymer
- Polyvinylpolypyrrolidone
