= Ripper Method =

The Ripper Method, developed in 1898, is an analytical chemistry technique used to determine the total amount of sulfur dioxide (SO_{2}) in a solution. This technique uses iodine standard and a starch indicator to titrate the solution and determine the concentration of free SO_{2}. The titration is done again with a new sample of the solution, but the sample is pretreated with sodium hydroxide (NaOH) to release bound SO_{2}. The result of these two titrations can then be used to determine the bound, free, and total amount of SO_{2} in the solution. Instead of using a starch indicator, an electrode can be used to determine the presence of free iodine. This technique is widely used in wine making.

== Chemical Equilibria ==
The first reaction of iodine with SO_{2} and water is as follows:

SO_{2}+I_{2}+2H_{2}O→H_{2}SO_{4}+2HI

As the reaction proceeds, all available SO_{2} will be consumed and the starch indicator added to the solution will bind with the unconsumed iodine, turning the solution black.

The second step of the reaction requires pretreating with solution with NaOH to release bound SO_{2}. The reaction with iodine can then be done.

HSO_{3}^{−}⇌H_{2}SO_{3}⇌SO_{2}

== Applications ==
The Ripper Method is commonly used in wine making applications as SO_{2} is often added to wine to maintain its freshness and the concentration needs to be determined. The technique is not precise and is prone to systematic error as well. This limits its use, despite being a fast and inexpensive test.
