= Depth filter =

Fluid filtration medium

Depth filters are filters that use a porous filtration medium to retain particles throughout the medium, rather than just on the surface of the medium. Depth filtration, typified by multiple porous layers with depth, is used to capture the solid contaminants from the liquid phase. These filters are commonly used when the fluid to be filtered contains a high load of particles because, relative to other types of filters, they can retain a large mass of particles before becoming clogged.

== Designs available ==
Various designs have been implemented to ensure feasible processes whilst retaining the main objective of depth filters.

Design	Characteristic	Number of cycles	Dimensions	Industrial applications
Pads and panels (cassettes)	Thick sheets or thinner sheets folded filter material shaped into rectangular a shape. Packed into a rectangular frame with a dividing wall.	Only used for 1–2 cleaning cycles	Available in 400, 1600, or 3600 cm^{2} with a flow 75 L/h over each pad and can increase to 130 L/h by polishing filtration.	Food and Beverage – fruit juices, soft drinks Chemicals –Manufacturing paints, organic solvents, ink Petroleum – Wax, kerosene Winery, cosmetics
Thick cartridge	A single piece of the filter material wound around a perforated cylinder, made of metal or stiff plastic, where the fluid or gas with solute flows inside the cylinder.	Once the filter medium has reached its maximum solute load the cartridge is discarded. Backwashing can make the filter complete more cleaning cycles		Home water and pool filters Industrial separations for hydrocarbon fuels
Deep bed (sand filter)	The filter medium has the solution on top and utilizes gravity to filter particles. It is the oldest and simplest method of filtration.	Multiple filtering cycles and is usually cleaned by flow reversal.	Types of deep bed: 1. Slow defined by the low water flow rate (0.1–0.2 m/h), finer particle size (0.35–0.5 mm) and has a depth around 0.6–1.0 m deep.; 2. Rapid has a faster flow (5–7 times faster than slow) and coarser particles (0.5–0.6 mm) and has a depth about 0.75 m deep.	Potable water, polishing following wastewater treatment, pre-treatment for desalination
Lenticular	Stacked disc design - mechanical compression seals (seven seals per eight-cell filter) between plastic “knife edges” and filter media.		300 or 400 mm disc diameter	Fermented products, cannabis oil filtration

== Applications of depth filters and advantages ==
The use of deep bed sand filters as the final step in municipal potable water treatment has increased significantly over the past decade, with its application ranging from clarification and processing of drinking water to wastewater treatment plants where the wastewater is required to be polished before being discharged.

The main deep bed filtration processes currently used are direct filtration and contact-flocculation filtration. Direct filtration involves a short period of pre flocculation stage followed by the filtration process. In sewage treatment plants, the majority of suspended solids and other contaminants are successfully removed after the primary and secondary treatment stages. To remove the remaining solids and organic compounds from the wastewater stream, direct filtration method is utilised with prior flocculation. As the contaminant separation process takes place in the filter medium, factors such as flocculation time, filtration velocity and flocculent dosage are required to be monitored regularly, as they can directly affect the flocculent size produced. This is vital to the process in order to prevent potential clogging or bioclogging of the filter bed.

The advantages associated with this process include the ability to produce large flocculent, which can then be filtered. The other advantage of the depth filtration method is the flexibility in the choice of filter arrangement, which allows high solid storage capacities to be obtained, while keeping the energy consumption rate within an acceptable range. The downside of using direct filtration is that microbes are able to grow within the channels of the filter and hence reproduce throughout long operating runs. This reproduction of organisms within the filter matrix can result in the contamination of the filtrate.

Depth filtration is also widely used for the clarification of cell culture clarification. The cell culture systems can contain yeast, bacterial and other contaminant cells and hence, an efficient clarification stage is vital to separate the cells and other colloidal matter to produce a particle free cell system [9]. Most depth filters used in pharmaceutical processes such as cell system harvesting are composed of cellulose fibres and filter aids. The direct flow design in depth filters provides a financially suitable solution by trapping the contaminants within the filter channel while ensuring the maximum recovery rate of the product. The other advantages of this system include its low power costs, since the pumps utilised in depth filters require minimal power input due to the small pressure within the system. Depth filtration is also flexible in terms of being able to scale up or down the system while outputting a high rate of yield (>95%).

== Limitations of depth filtrations over competitive processes ==
Besides Depth Filtration, a number of membrane filtration methods are also used for different industrial applications such as Reverse Osmosis, nano-filtration and Microfiltration. These use the same principle, rejecting contaminants larger than the filter size. The main distinguishing feature amongst them is their effective pore size. For example, Microfiltration operates by allowing large particles to pass through the filter media, whilst Reverse Osmosis rejects all the particles except very small species. Most membrane filters can be utilized for final filtration whilst depth filters tend to be more effective when used in clarifying applications, hence a combination of the two processes can provide a suitable filtration system, which can be adapted to many applications.

== Assessment of main process characteristics ==
Process Characteristics such as filtration rate and filter media are important design considerations and greatly impact filter performance, as a result continuous monitoring and assessment is necessary to ensure greater control over the process quality.

=== Treated flow rate ===
The flow rate is defined as the ratio of the driving force over the filter resistance. The two conventional types of depth filter designs: the rapid and slow filters operate with velocities of 5–15 m/h and 0.1-0.2 m/h respectively; whereas pressurised sand filters have design flow rates of 238 L/min. During operation the filter rate decreases due to increasing filter resistance as particulates get lodged within the media. The rate of filtration affects the rate of clogging with high filter rates causing faster build up. Pilot tests demonstrate that the higher the filter rate the lower the filter area whilst increasing filter rate reduces the time to breakthrough, reduces the time to head loss (increases head loss) and results in shorter runs and lower optimum depths. They also demonstrate that higher filter rates can be achieved by using larger diameter media and increased media depth. High filtration rates depend on media design with the highest filtration rate design in service at 13.5gpm/ft2.

=== Backwashing in depth filters ===
Backwashing is an important operation employed to remove filtered solids as this build up causes resistance to filtration to increase with time. Backwashing involves inverting the direction of liquid flow while using clean liquid. This process is employed for times in the range of 5–15 minutes with typical flow rates per unit area in the range of 6.8- 13.6 L/m2.s. Most designs typically employ backwashing once per day of operation. The operation of depth filters is inherently cyclic due to the necessity of solids removal build up during the process, as such two or more units are typically used so that backwashing does not interfere with the filtration. Effective backwashing occurs when the filter medium is fluidized. Fluidization flow rates generally fall in the range of 20-50 gpm/ft2.

=== Separation efficiencies ===
Rates of removal for pressurized sand filters with media typically in the range of 0.3- 0.5 mm have been reported to be at 95 of particles as small as 6 μm with media size of 0.3 mm and 95% removal rate of particles as small as 15 μm for media size of 0.5 mm.

=== Filter media ===
There is a variety of filter media that can be employed in depth filter processes, the most common being sand. Choice of filter media has effects on filter rate, turbidity and filter surface area. Clean bed head loss (pressure drop) is sensitive to media diameter where increasing media diameter results in a longer time to design head loss. Increasing the media diameter and filter rate however results in degradation of effluent turbidity. To compensate, media depth can be increased to reduce the effects on effluent turbidity. The max value of media depth used in designs so far for high rate filtration is 100 in, whilst the maximum media size used in pilots is 2mm in diameter. Sand, magnetite, coke and anthracite are the most commonly used particle mediums in industry particularly to their wide availability.

Table [1] Process/Design Characteristics of Monomedium Filter Beds for Wastewater treatment (Deep Bed):

Characteristic	Parameter Range	Commonly employed parameter values
Media type: Sand		
Media Depth (cm)	90-180	120
Effective Size (mm)	2-3	2.5
Filtration Rate m/h	5-24	12
Media Type: Anthracite		
Media Depth (cm)	90-215	150
Effective Size (mm)	2-4	2.75
Filtration Rate m/h	5-24	12

Table [2] Design Parameters for Pressure Depth Filters:

Media Effective Size (mm)	Filtration Rate m/h
0.35	25-35
0.55	40-50
0.75	55-70
0.95	70-90

== Design heuristics ==
Depth filtration may be used in pre-treatment, removing suspended particles from a carrying fluid intended to be used as a feed stream or in the context of clarification where particulates are removed to purify a product stream.

Several heuristics are adopted into the design of depth filters in order to ensure consistent operation throughout the life of the filter.

=== Particle retention and filter media ===
The relationship between retention and particles size is not a step function. Larger particles are easily retained by the filter media; however particulates that are within the intermediate range between the nominal particle and waste components are harder to preserve and as a result are often lost as a waste component.

To maximize the retention passage for a range of particle sizes, filter media is layered in a manner such that sections with a higher pore size are closer to the inlet stream, capturing particles of a larger size. Pore sizes decrease as it approaches the outlet stream. By adopting this method, the filter media caters for a wider range of particle sizes, resulting in greater control of retention and extending the life of the filter.

=== Filter media selection ===
Filter selection is reliant on a number of variables such load, duration, shape, size and distribution of the substance desired to be filtered. Ideally if the medium is too large, filtrate will be of a poor quality as it will fail to collect particulates within its matrix. Conversely if the medium is very small, solids will accumulate on the surface of the cartridge causing close to immediate blockages. In regards to the shape using grains that are round in shape have the tendency to erode due to the pressure the inlet stream may possess on the system, whereas grains that are flat (may increase surface area) however may float out of the system during backwash. Particles which are high on Moh's scale of hardness and have a relatively large specific gravity are often recommended to be used as particle media. The softer and lighter the material is, the more susceptible it is to erosion and fluidization. Thus particles such as silica and sand are often used as they are affordable however are resistant to the high flows of the incoming fluid. The uniformity coefficient is a measure of the uniformity of the material used within the filter. It is a ratio of a sieve pore that allows 60% of the material through in comparison to a pore size that allows 10% of material through. The closer the ratio is to one, means the closer the particles are in size. An ideal system would have a coefficient between 1.3 and 1.5 and must not exceed 1.7. Anything less than 1.3 is an indication that it is unnecessary to the system and may result in higher costs without providing any additional form of optimization. Beyond 1.5 indicates that the system may experience a greater pressure drop and as mentioned may result in clogging, seeping of waste flow and reduced filtration rate. As a guideline it is recommended that the smallest particles used within depth filters should be placed at least 150 mm from the outlet stream to prevent fluidization.

=== Dead end operation of depth filters ===
Depth filters are operated as dead end filters with the velocity of the inlet streams crucial to the performance of the filter. High velocity inlet streams with relatively large particulates will cause possible clogging and wearing down of the filter media. This will cause an increase in pressure drop of the system. In situations where the filter media is clogged and pressure drop continually increases it is common that waste particles and streams may seep through the zones within the cartridge and pass through the outlet stream resulting in no purification

To minimize the effects of clogging and particle build-up a back flushing system must accommodate approximately 1-5% of the bulk flow as back flush, operating at approximately 6-8 bar. Beyond this range particulates may become fragmented making them difficult to be removed from the system, and potentially cause fluidization of the system.

=== Post treatment systems and waste stream production ===
The main purpose of a depth filter is to act as a clarifier, separating suspended solids from a bulk flow liquid stream and as a result is employed within the final stage of a separation process. By convention, depth filters consist of a single outlet stream of a purified liquid retaining the waste particles within its system. Due to its length it has greater residue holding capabilities than standard filters. In terms of a waste stream, often the outlet stream may be recycled into a subsequent filter in order to ensure that the stream is free from particulates. A waste stream may also be produced when cleaning the filter media as the water passes in the opposite direction residue caught within the filter media or media particles that have been displaced may emerge from the unit before it is adequately disposed.

== New developments ==
With the ongoing advancements in process technologies, depth filters have been modified to improve its feasibility within a range of industrial sectors.

Design	Characteristic	Improvement	Industry
Pod Lenticular	Filtration is achieved by forces, such as gravity and water pressure, acting on the knife edge seals compressing the filter material and filtering the liquid	Scale up of product by connecting 1-5 or 5-30 Pods into a single holder; Increase volume yield by 40-70% over conventional lenticular disc; Filter area available in 0.11, 0.55 and 1.1 m2; The ability to test the integrity of filter which the conventional lenticular cannot be tested.	Pharmaceutical sector-separation of cellular organisms from liquid.
Continuous deep-bed filters	Applying rapid sand filtration and having the dirty solid with the filter material being captured. A jet of air carries the filter medium with solid into a wash zone above the filter and is separated. The cleaned filter material is then added back into the deep-bed filter.	Water and Solid flows are counter current, therefore increasing the solid removal	Water treatment- improved separation techniques during pre-treatment
