= Polyvinylpolypyrrolidone =

Names
- IUPAC name 1-ethenylpyrrolidin-2-one
- Other names: Polyvinyl polypyrrolidone; crospovidone; crospolividone; E1202; Kollidon CL

Identifiers
CAS Number	25249-54-1
Abbreviations	PVPP
ChemSpider	none
ECHA InfoCard	100.110.608
E number	E1202 (additional chemicals)
CompTox Dashboard (EPA)	DTXSID2021440

Pharmacology
ATC code	A07BC03 (WHO)
- Except where otherwise noted, data are given for materials in their standard state (at 25 °C [77 °F], 100 kPa). Infobox references

Polyvinylpolypyrrolidone (polyvinyl polypyrrolidone, PVPP, crospovidone, crospolividone, or E1202) is a highly cross-linked modification of polyvinylpyrrolidone (PVP).

This cross-linked form of PVP is used as a disintegrant (see also excipients) in pharmaceutical tablets.

PVPP is insoluble in water, though it still absorbs water and swells very rapidly generating a swelling force. This property makes it useful as a disintegrant in tablets.

PVPP can be used as a drug, taken as a tablet or suspension to absorb compounds (so-called endotoxins) that cause diarrhea. (Cf. bone char, charcoal.)

It is also used as a fining to extract impurities (via agglomeration followed by filtration). It is used in winemaking. Using the same principle it is used to remove polyphenols in beer production and thus clear beers with stable foam are produced. One such commercial product is called Polyclar. PVPP forms bonds similar to peptidic bonds in protein (especially, like proline residues) and that is why it can precipitate tannins the same way as proteins do.

PVPP is used as a stabiliser.

== Safety ==
Autopsies have found that crospovidone/PVPP contributes to pulmonary vascular injury in substance abusers who have injected pharmaceutical tablets intended for oral consumption.

== See also ==
- Polyethylene glycol-polyvinyl alcohol
