= Isinglass =

Substance obtained from the dried swim bladders of fish

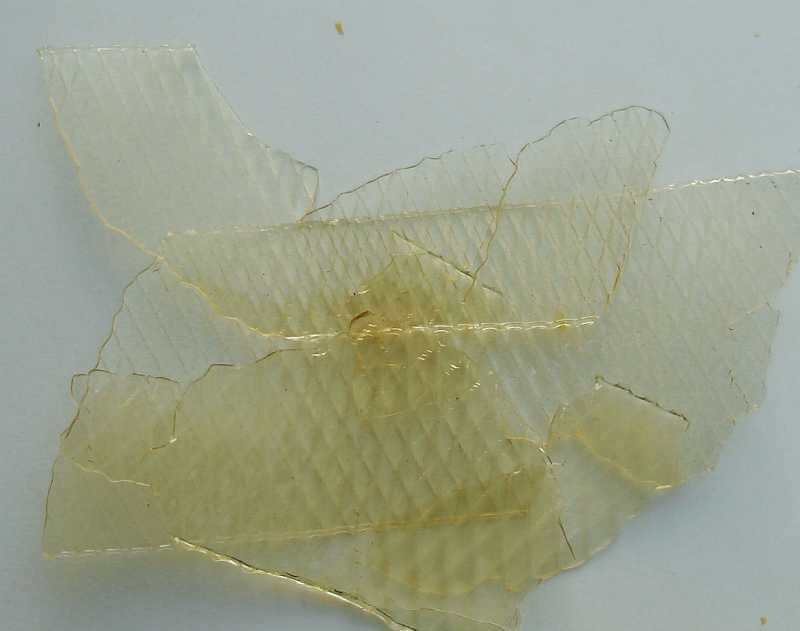
Isinglass

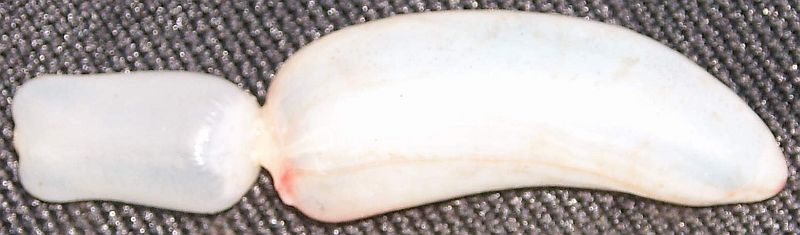
Swim bladder of a rudd (Scardinius erythrophthalmus)

Isinglass (/ˈaɪzɪŋɡlæs, -ɡlɑːs/ EYE-zing-gla(h)ss) is a form of collagen obtained from the dried swim bladders of fish. The English word origin is from the obsolete Dutch huizenblaas – huizen is a kind of sturgeon, and blaas is a bladder, or German Hausenblase, meaning essentially the same. The bladders, once removed from the fish, processed, and dried, are formed into various shapes for use.

It is used mainly for the clarification or fining of some beer and wine. It can also be cooked into a paste for specialised gluing purposes.

Although originally made exclusively from sturgeon, especially beluga, in 1795 an invention by William Murdoch facilitated a cheap substitute using cod. This was extensively used in Britain in place of Russian isinglass, and in the US hake was important. In modern British brewing all commercial isinglass products are blends of material from a limited range of tropical fish.

== Foods and drinks ==
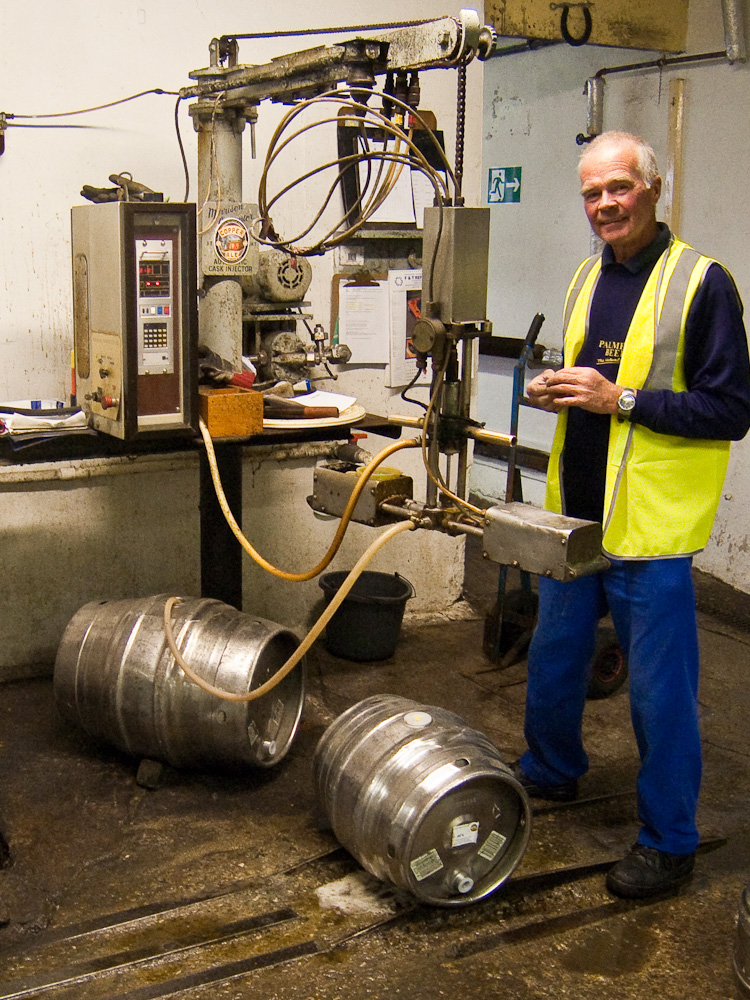
Adding finings to a cask of beer

Before the inexpensive production of gelatin and other competing products, isinglass was used in confectionery and desserts such as fruit jelly and blancmange.

Isinglass finings are widely used as a processing aid in the British brewing industry to accelerate the fining, or clarification, of beer. It is used particularly in the production of cask-conditioned beers, although many cask ales are available which are not fined using isinglass. The finings flocculate the live yeast in the beer into a jelly-like mass, which settles to the bottom of the cask. Left undisturbed, beer will clear naturally; the use of isinglass finings accelerates the process. Isinglass is sometimes used with an auxiliary fining, which further accelerates the process of sedimentation.

Non-cask beers that are destined for kegs, cans, or bottles are often pasteurised and filtered. The yeast in these beers tends to settle to the bottom of the storage tank naturally, so the sediment from these beers can often be filtered without using isinglass. However, some breweries still use isinglass finings for non-cask beers, especially when attempting to repair bad batches.

Many vegetarians consider beers that are processed with these finings (such as most cask-conditioned ales in the UK) to be unsuitable for vegetarian diets (although acceptable for pescetarians). According to global data in 2018, along with low-calorie beer and gluten-free beer, beers that are acceptable for strict vegetarians are expected to grow in demand in the coming years. The demand increase is attributed to millennial consumers, and some companies have introduced vegetarian friendly options or done away with isinglass use. A beer-fining agent that is suitable for vegetarians is Irish moss, a type of red algae containing the polymer chemical carrageenan. However, carrageenan-based products (used in both the boiling process and after fermentation) primarily reduce hazes caused by proteins, but isinglass is used at the end of the brewing process, after fermentation, to remove yeast. Since the two fining agents act differently (on different haze-forming particles), they are not interchangeable, and some beers use both.

Isinglass finings are also used in the production of kosher wines, although for reasons of kashrut, they are not derived from the beluga sturgeon, because this fish is not kosher. Whether the use of a nonkosher isinglass renders a beverage nonkosher is a matter of debate in Jewish law. Rabbi Yehezkel Landau, in Noda B'Yehuda, first edition, Yore Deah 26, for example, permits such beverages. This is the position followed by many kashrut-observant Jews today.

The similar-sounding names has resulted in confusion between isinglass and waterglass (sodium silicate), especially as both have been used to preserve eggs. A solution of isinglass was applied to eggs and allowed to dry, sealing their pores. Eggs were submerged in solutions of waterglass, and a gel of silicic acid formed, also sealing the pores of the eggshell.

== Conservation ==
Isinglass is also used as an adhesive to repair parchment, stucco, and damage to paintings on canvas. Pieces of the best Russian isinglass are soaked overnight to soften and swell the dried material. Next, it is cooked slowly in a double boiler at 45 °C (113F) while being stirred. A small amount of gum tragacanth dissolved in water is added to the strained isinglass solution to act as an emulsifier.

When repairing paint that is flaking from parchment, isinglass can be applied directly to an area which has been soaked with a small amount of ethanol. It is typically applied as a very tiny drop that is then guided, with the help of a binocular microscope, under the edges of flaking paint.

It can also be used to coat tissue or goldbeater's skin. On paintings, this can be used as a temporary backing to either canvas patches or filler until dried. Here, isinglass is similar to parchment size and other forms of gelatin, but it is unique in that as a dried film the adhesive can be reactivated with moisture. For this use, the isinglass is cooked with a few drops of glycerin or honey. This adhesive is advantageous in situations where minimal use of water is desired for the parchment as the isinglass can be reactivated with an ethanol-water mixture. It also has a greater adhesive strength than many other adhesives used for parchment repair.
