= Finings =

Clarifying agents with many uses

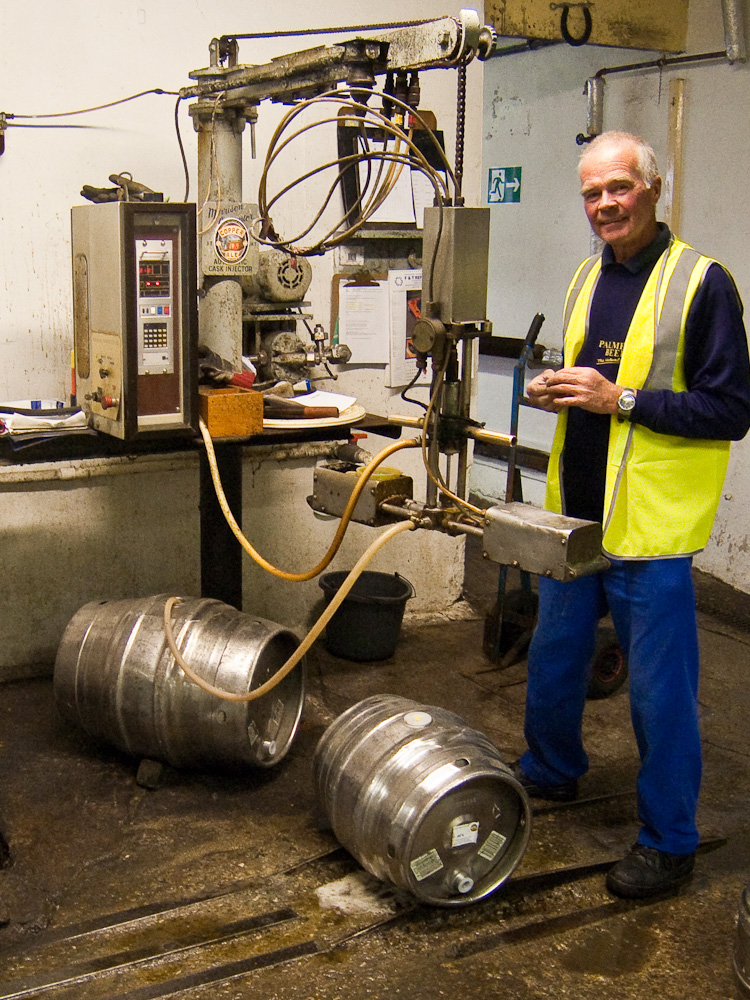
Adding finings to a cask of beer

Finings are substances that are usually added at or near the completion of the processing of making wine, beer, and various nonalcoholic juice beverages. They are used to remove compounds, either to improve clarity or adjust flavor or aroma. The removed compounds may be sulfides, proteins, polyphenols, benzenoids, or copper ions. Unless they form a stable sediment in the final container, the spent finings are usually discarded from the beverage along with the target compounds that they capture.

Substances used as finings include egg whites, blood, milk, isinglass, and Irish moss. These are still used by some producers, but more modern substances have also been introduced and are more widely used, including bentonite, gelatin, casein, carrageenan, alginate, diatomaceous earth, pectinase, pectolyase, PVPP, kieselsol (colloidal silica), copper sulfate, dried albumen (egg whites), hydrated yeast, and activated carbon.

== Actions ==
Finings’ actions may be broadly categorized as either electrostatic, adsorbent, ionic, or enzymatic.

The electrostatic types comprise the vast majority; including all but activated carbon, fining yeast, PVPP, copper sulfate, pectinase and pectolase. Their purpose is to selectively remove proteins, tannins (polyphenolics) and coloring particles (melanoidins). They must be used as a batch technique, as opposed to flow-through processing methods such as filters. Their particles each have an electric charge which is attracted to the oppositely charged particles of the colloidal dispersion that they are breaking. The result is that the two substances become bound as a stable complex; their net charge becoming neutral. Thus the agglomeration of a semi-solid follows, which may be separated from the beverage either as a floating or settled mass.

The only adsorbent types of finings in use are activated carbon and specialized fining yeasts. Although activated carbon may be implemented as a flow-through filter, it is also commonly utilized as a batch ingredient, which later must be separated and discarded from the beverage. Activated carbon can remove benzenoid compounds and all classes of polyphenols non-specifically, either completely or partially, thus decolorizing and deodorizing juices and wines. Traditionally, yeast fining has involved the addition of hydrated yeasts used as adsorption agents. Consisting of approximately 30% protein, yeast cell walls have a chemical affinity with wine compounds, such as those that may be polyphenolic or metallic. Indeed, yeast fining is a practical means of removing excess copper ions (greater than 0.5 mg/L) when copper sulfate is used to bind selected volatile sulfur compounds (VSCs).

The ionic finings are copper sulfate and PVPP. When dissolved in aqueous beverages, copper sulfate's copper ions can chemically bind undesirable sulfides. The resulting complexes must be removed by other finings. The action of PVPP appears to be through the formation of hydrogen bonds between its carbonyl groups and the phenolic hydrogens of the polyphenols. It attracts the low molecular weight polyphenols rather than the condensed tannins and leucoanthocyanins that are removed by gelatin.

The enzymatic finings are pectic and pectinase. They aid in destroying the large polysaccharide molecule named pectin, which otherwise causes haze in fruit wines and juices. They are among the few finings that are added before juices are fermented.

== Nutritional concerns ==
Unfortunately, beneficial antioxidant flavonoids are removed by some finings. Quercetin is removed from red wines via the finings gelatin, casein, and PVPP to reduce astringent flavors. If other fining methods are used, the quercetin remains in the wine. Similarly the catechin flavonoids are removed by PVPP and other finings that target polyphenolic compounds.

== Vegetarianism concerns ==
Since some finings are animal products and others are not, it can be difficult for consumers to find out whether a particular wine or beer is vegan, vegetarian, or neither, unless the producer or seller chooses to label it as such. The website Barnivore maintains an international database of wines and beers, classifying each as "Vegan Friendly" or "Not Vegan Friendly"

== See also ==
- Clarifying agent
- Clarification and stabilization of wine#Fining
- Beer Clarifying Agent
- Wine Clarifying Agent
