= Benzylamine =

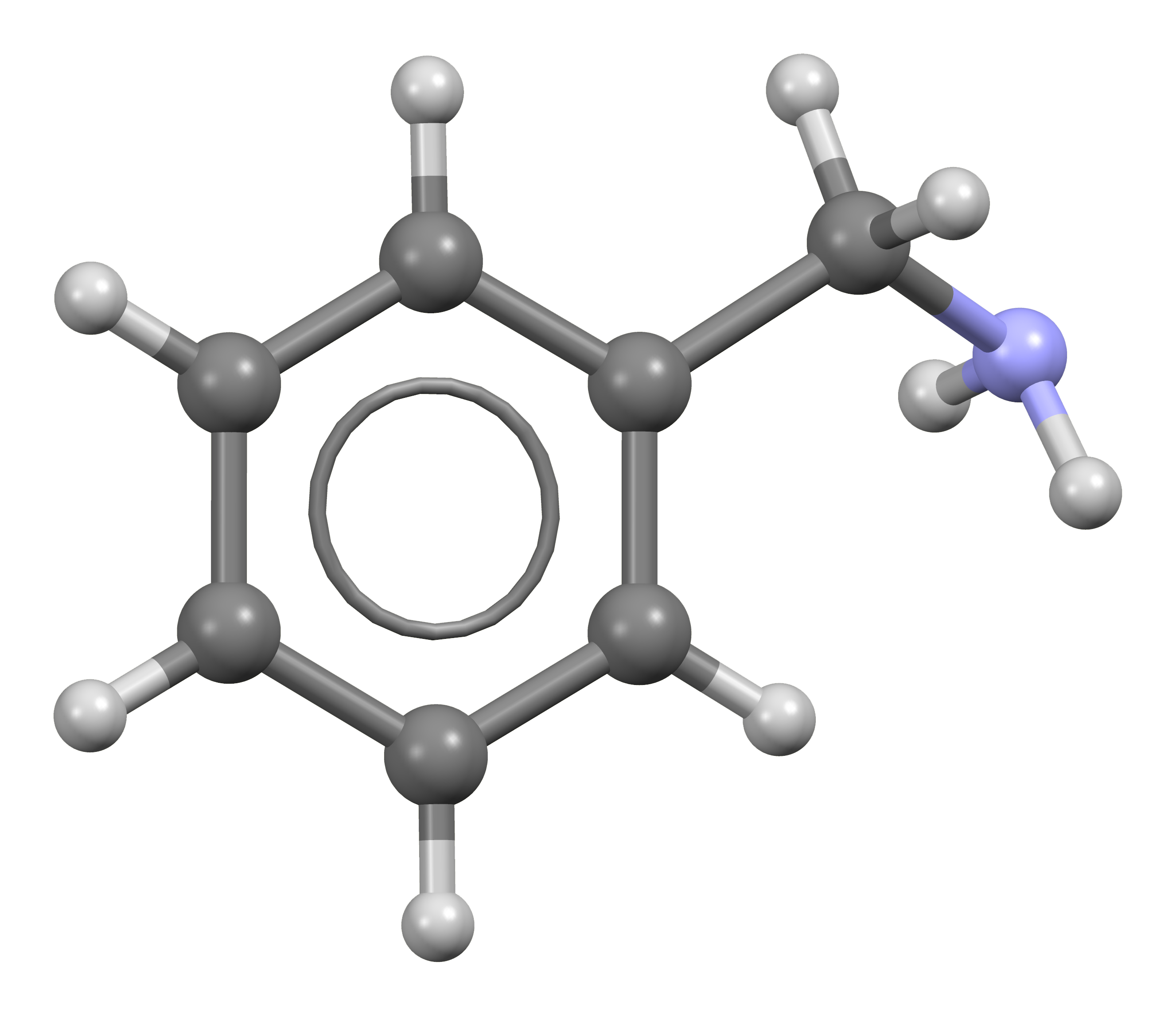

Names
- Preferred IUPAC name Phenylmethanamine
- Other names α-Aminotoluene; Benzyl amine Phenylmethylamine

Identifiers
| CAS Number | 100-46-9 |
| 3D model (JSmol) | Interactive image |
| Abbreviations | BnNH_{2} PhCH2NH_{2} |
| Beilstein Reference | 741984 |
| ChEBI | CHEBI:40538 |
| ChEMBL | ChEMBL522 |
| ChemSpider | 7223 |
| DrugBank | DB02464 |
| ECHA InfoCard | 100.002.595 |
| EC Number | 202-854-1 |
| Gmelin Reference | 49783 |
| KEGG | C15562 |
| PubChem CID | 7504 |
| RTECS number | DP1488500 |
| UNII | A1O31ROR09 |
| UN number | 2735 |
| CompTox Dashboard (EPA) | DTXSID5021839 |
- InChI: InChI=1S/C7H9N/c8-6-7-4-2-1-3-5-7/h1-5H,6,8H2 Key: WGQKYBSKWIADBV-UHFFFAOYSA-N; InChI=1/C7H9N/c8-6-7-4-2-1-3-5-7/h1-5H,6,8H2 Key: WGQKYBSKWIADBV-UHFFFAOYAL
- SMILES: c1ccc(cc1)CN

Properties
| Chemical formula | C_{7}H_{9}N |
| Molar mass | 107.156 g·mol^{−1} |
| Appearance | Colorless liquid |
| Odor | weak, ammonia-like |
| Density | 0.981 g/mL |
| Melting point | 10 °C (50 °F; 283 K) |
| Boiling point | 185 °C (365 °F; 458 K) |
| Solubility in water | Miscible |
| Solubility | miscible in ethanol, diethyl ether very soluble in acetone soluble in benzene, chloroform |
| Acidity (pK_{a}) | 9.34 |
| Basicity (pK_{b}) | 4.66 |
| Magnetic susceptibility (χ) | −75.26·10^{−6} cm^{3}/mol |
| Refractive index (n_{D}) | 1.543 |

Structure
| Dipole moment | 1.38 D |

Hazards
- Occupational safety and health (OHS/OSH)
| Main hazards | Flammable and corrosive |
- GHS labelling
| Pictograms | (GHS05: Corrosive) (GHS07: Exclamation mark) |
| Signal word | Danger |
| Hazard statements | H302, H312, H314 |
| Precautionary statements | P260, P264, P270, P280, P301+P312, P301+P330+P331, P302+P352, P303+P361+P353, P304+P340, P305+P351+P338, P310, P312, P321, P322, P330, P363, P405, P501 |
| NFPA 704 (fire diamond) | 3 2 0 |
| Flash point | 65 °C (149 °F; 338 K) |
| Safety data sheet (SDS) | Fischer Scientific |

Related compounds
| Related amines | aniline |
- Except where otherwise noted, data are given for materials in their standard state (at 25 °C [77 °F], 100 kPa). verify (what is ?) Infobox references

Benzylamine, also known as phenylmethylamine, is an organic chemical compound with the condensed structural formula C_{6}H_{5}CH_{2}NH_{2} (sometimes abbreviated as PhCH_{2}NH_{2} or BnNH_{2}). It consists of a benzyl group, C_{6}H_{5}CH_{2,} attached to an amine functional group, NH_{2}. This colorless water-soluble liquid is a common precursor in organic chemistry and used in the industrial production of many pharmaceuticals. The hydrochloride salt was used to treat motion sickness on the Mercury-Atlas 6 mission in which NASA astronaut John Glenn became the first American to orbit the Earth.

== Manufacturing ==
Benzylamine can be produced by several methods, the main industrial route being the reaction of benzyl chloride and ammonia. It is also produced by the reduction of benzonitrile and reductive amination of benzaldehyde, both done over Raney nickel.

It was first produced accidentally by Rudolf Leuckart in the reaction of benzaldehyde with formamide in a process now known as the Leuckart reaction.

== Biochemistry ==
Benzylamine occurs biologically from the action of the N-substituted formamide deformylase enzyme, which is produced by Arthrobacter pascens bacteria. This hydrolase catalyses the conversion of N-benzylformamide into benzylamine with formate as a by-product. Benzylamine is degraded biologically by the action of the monoamine oxidase B enzyme, resulting in benzaldehyde.

== Uses ==
Benzylamine is used as a masked source of ammonia, since after N-alkylation, the benzyl group can be removed by hydrogenolysis:

C_{6}H_{5}CH_{2}NH_{2} + 2 RBr → C_{6}H_{5}CH_{2}NR_{2} + 2 HBr
C_{6}H_{5}CH_{2}NR_{2} + H_{2} → C_{6}H_{5}CH_{3} + R_{2}NH

Typically a base is employed in the first step to absorb the HBr (or related acid for other kinds of alkylating agents).

Benzylamine reacts with acetyl chloride to form N-benzylacetamide.

Isoquinolines can be prepared from benzylamine and glyoxal acetal by an analogous approach known as the Schlittler-Müller modification to the Pomeranz–Fritsch reaction. This modification can also be used for preparing substituted isoquinolines.

Synthesis of HNIW from benzylamine

Benzylamine is used in the manufacture of other pharmaceuticals, including alniditan, lacosamide, moxifloxacin, and nebivolol.

Benzylamine is also used to manufacture the military explosive hexanitrohexaazaisowurtzitane (HNIW), which is superior to older nitroamine high explosives like HMX and RDX. Illustrating the debenzylation tendency of benzylamines, four of the benzyl groups are removed from hexabenzylhexaazaisowurtzitane by hydrogenolysis catalysed by palladium on carbon.

== Pharmacology and derivatives ==
Benzylamine's α-methylated derivative has been found to act as a monoamine oxidase inhibitor (MAOI), including of both monoamine oxidase A (MAO-A) and monoamine oxidase B (MAO-B).

A derivative, pargyline (N-methyl-N-propargylbenzylamine), is an MAOI that has been used pharmaceutically as an antihypertensive agent and antidepressant. α-Methylbenzylamine (1-phenylethylamine) is an MAOI, inhibiting both MAO-A and MAO-B, as well.

Another derivative, α,N-DMMDBA (MDM1EA; α,N-dimethyl-3,4-methylenedioxybenzylamine), partially substitutes for MDMA at high doses in drug discrimination tests in rats. Benzylamine is also similar in structure to benzylpiperazine (BZP), which is a monoamine releasing agent and psychostimulant. However, both benzylamine and α-methylbenzylamine have been found to be inactive as norepinephrine releasing agents.

== Salts ==
The hydrochloride salt of benzylamine, C_{6}H_{5}CH_{2}NH_{3}Cl or C_{6}H_{5}CH_{2}NH_{2}·HCl, is prepared by reacting benzylamine with hydrochloric acid, and can be used in treating motion sickness. NASA astronaut John Glenn was issued with benzylamine hydrochloride for this purpose for the Mercury-Atlas 6 mission. The cation in this salt is called benzylammonium and is a moiety found in pharmaceuticals such as the anthelmintic agent bephenium hydroxynaphthoate, used in treating ascariasis.

Other derivatives of benzylamine and its salts have been shown to have anti-emetic properties, including those with the N-(3,4,5-trimethoxybenzoyl)benzylamine moiety. Commercially available motion-sickness agents including cinnarizine and meclizine are derivatives of benzylamine.

== Other benzylamines ==
1-Phenylethylamine is a methylated benzylamine derivative that is chiral; enantiopure forms are obtained by resolving racemates. Its racemic form is sometimes known as (±)-α-methylbenzylamine. Both benzylamine and 1-phenylethylamine form stable ammonium salts and imines due to their relatively high basicity.

== Safety and environment ==
Benzylamine exhibits modest oral toxicity in rats with LD_{50} of 1130 mg/kg. It is readily biodegraded.
