= Diastereomeric recrystallization =

Chiral resolution method

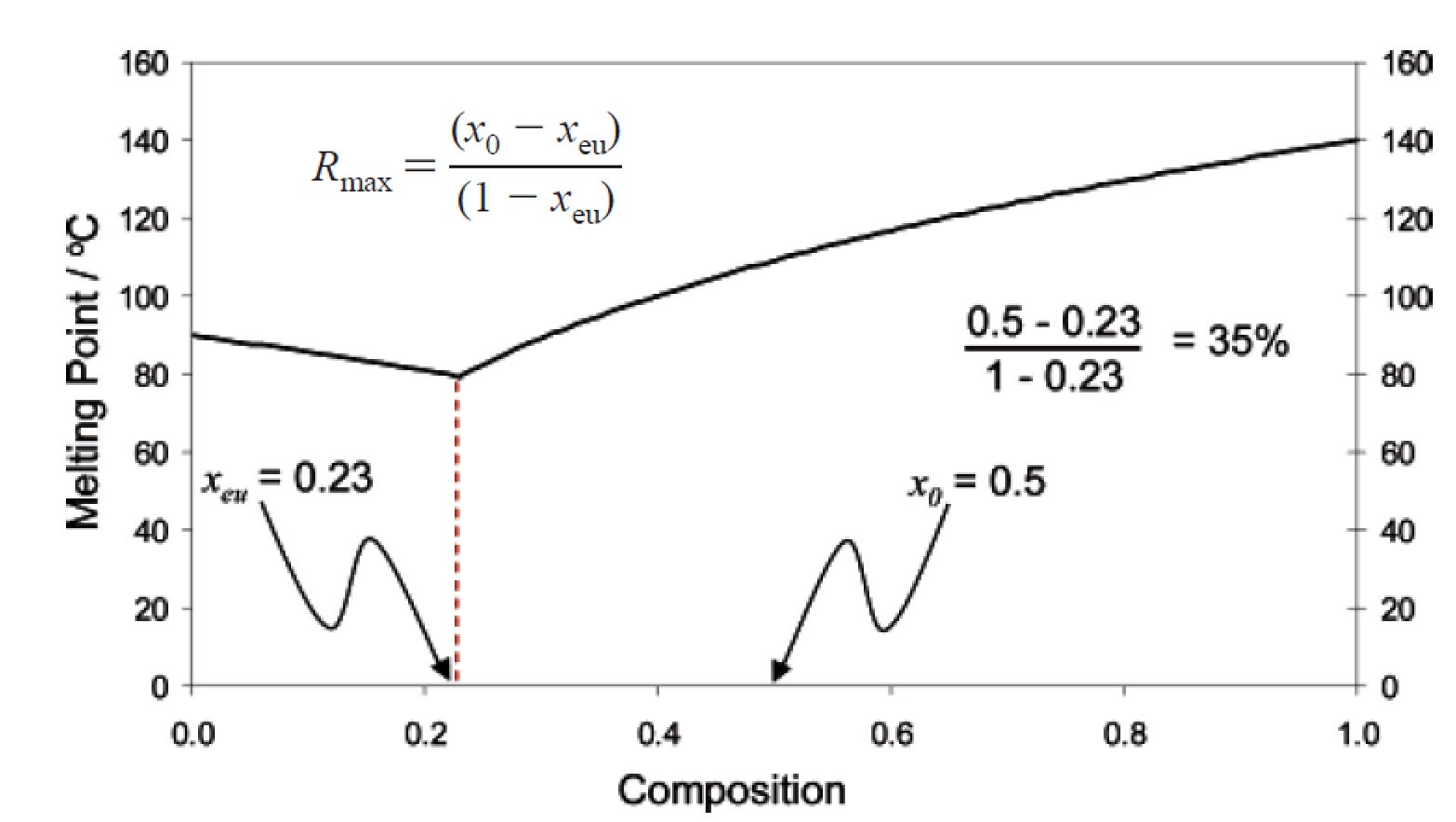
Figure 1: Melting point phase diagram (using the Schroeder – van Laar Equation) of a prototypical diastereomeric system. nb. utility in a solvent mediated crystallization implicitly assumes ideal behaviour (in that changing the solvent will not change the composition of the binary eutectic). In this example, assuming a racemate (50:50 mix of enantiomers), then with a eutectic of 0.23, the maximum yield we can expect from system, via crystallization, is 35%.

Diastereomeric recrystallisation is a method of chiral resolution of enantiomers from a racemic mixture. It differs from asymmetric synthesis, which aims to produce a single enantiomer from the beginning, in that diastereomeric recrystallisation separates two enantiomers that have already mixed into a single solution. The strategy of diastereomeric recrystallisation involves two steps. The first step is to convert the enantiomers into diastereomers by way of a chemical reaction. A mixture of enantiomers may contain two isomers of a molecule with one chiral center. After adding a second chiral center in a determined location, the two isomers are still different, but they are no longer mirror images of each other; rather, they become diastereomers.

In a prototypical example, a mixture of R and S enantiomers with one chiral center would become a mixture of (R,S) and (S,S) diastereomers. (The R-S notation is explained here.) The conversion of the enantiomeric mixture into a diastereomer pair, depending on the nature of the chemicals, can be via covalent bond formation with the enantiopure resolving agent, or by salt formation, the latter being particularly convenient since acid base chemistry is typically quite operationally simple and high yielding.

The second step, once the diastereomers have formed, is to separate them using recrystallisation. This is possible because enantiomers have shared physical properties such as melting point and boiling point, but diastereomers have different chemical properties, so they can be separated like any two different molecules. It is these, now different, physical properties e.g. Melting point & Enthalpy of fusion which determine the eutectic composition (see Eutectic system) which correlates with the maximum yield of pure diastereomer in the crystallization (R_{max}, see example melting point phase diagram of a diastereomeric system across all compositions in Figure 1). Various methods have been developed to screening diastereomeric resolutions by determining the eutectic composition as a means of ranking for yield efficiency.
