= NFDA =

NFDA may refer to:

- National Food and Drug Authority, a licensing and regulatory agency in Uganda
- N-substituted formamide deformylase, an enzyme
