= DIPT (disambiguation) =

DIPT can refer to:

- Diisopropyltryptamine, a psychedelic hallucinogenic drug
- Diisopropyl tartrate, a reagent for organic synthesis
- Diploma of Teaching, an educational qualification
