= Chiral pool =

Collection of enantiomers

The chiral pool is a "collection of abundant enantiopure building blocks provided by nature" used in synthesis. In other words, a chiral pool would be a large quantity of common organic enantiomers. Contributors to the chiral pool are amino acids, sugars, and terpenes. Their use improves the efficiency of total synthesis. Not only does the chiral pool contribute a premade carbon skeleton, their chirality is usually preserved in the remainder of the reaction sequence.

This strategy is especially helpful if the desired molecule resembles cheap enantiopure natural products. Many times, suitable enantiopure starting materials cannot be identified. The alternative to the use of the chiral pool is asymmetric synthesis, whereby achiral precursors are employed or racemic intermediates are resolved.

== Examples ==
Use of verbenone (in red) as precursor to the drug paclitaxel. (Wrong arrow - not a retrosynthesis)

The use of the chiral pool is illustrated by the synthesis of the anticancer drug paclitaxel (Taxol). The incorporation of the C10 precursor verbenone, a member of the chiral pool, makes the production of paclitaxel more efficient than most alternatives.

Chiral pool synthesis is used to build a part of epothilone (an alternative to paclitaxel) from readily available enantiopure (–)-pantolactone.

=== Other uses of the chiral pool ===
In addition to serving as building blocks in total synthesis, the chiral pool is tapped to produce asymmetric catalysts, chiral protecting groups, and resolving agents.

==== Chiral ligands from the chiral pool ====
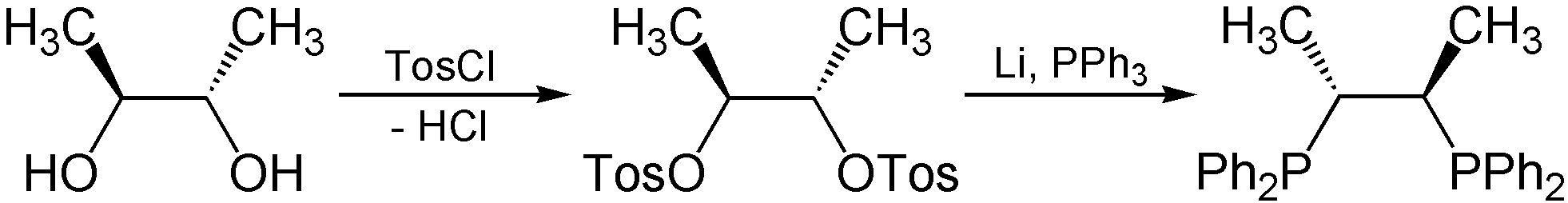

Asymmetric catalysis relies on chiral ligands, which in turn are generally derived from the chiral pool. For example, enantiopure 2,3-butanediol, derived from abundantly available tartaric acid, is used to synthesize chiraphos, a component of catalysts used for asymmetric hydrogenation:

==== Chiral reagents from the chiral pool ====
Synth-Chiraphos.png

Diisopinocampheylborane is an organoborane that is useful for asymmetric synthesis of secondary alcohols. It is derived by hydroboration of α-pinene, a common diterpene member of the chiral pool.

==== Resolving agents from the chiral pool ====
Many if not most of the common resolving agents are natural products or derivatives thereof. Illustrative is l-malic acid, a dicarboxylic acid that is found in apples. It is used to resolve α-phenylethylamine, a versatile resolving agent in its own right.
