= N-substituted formamide deformylase =

Identifiers
- EC no.: 3.5.1.91

Databases
- BRENDA: enzyme data
- ExPASy: NiceZyme view
- KEGG: enzyme entry
- MetaCyc: metabolic pathway
- Rhea: reactions
- PDB structures: RCSB PDB PDBe PDBsum
Search
- PMC: articles
- PubMed: articles
- NCBI: proteins

N-substituted formamide deformylase (EC 3.5.1.91) is an enzyme characterised from Arthrobacter pascens that catalyzes the hydrolysis of N-substituted fromamides. The best substrate of those tested was N-benzylformamide, which reacts to give benzylamine and formic acid:

N-benzylformamide
H_{2}O
HCO_{2}H
H_{2}O
HCO_{2}H
benzylamine

The enzyme can also catalyse the reaction in the reverse direction, at high substrate concentrations. In Mycobacterium tuberculosis, the forward reaction is part of the breakdown pathway of the isonitrile group in metal-binding compounds in that bacterium.

This enzyme is a hydrolase, one acting on carbon-nitrogen bonds other than peptide bonds, specifically in linear amides. The systematic name of this enzyme class is N-benzylformamide amidohydrolase and is also called NfdA.
