= Malic acid =

Dicarboxylic acid responsible for apple acidity

- Skeletal structure

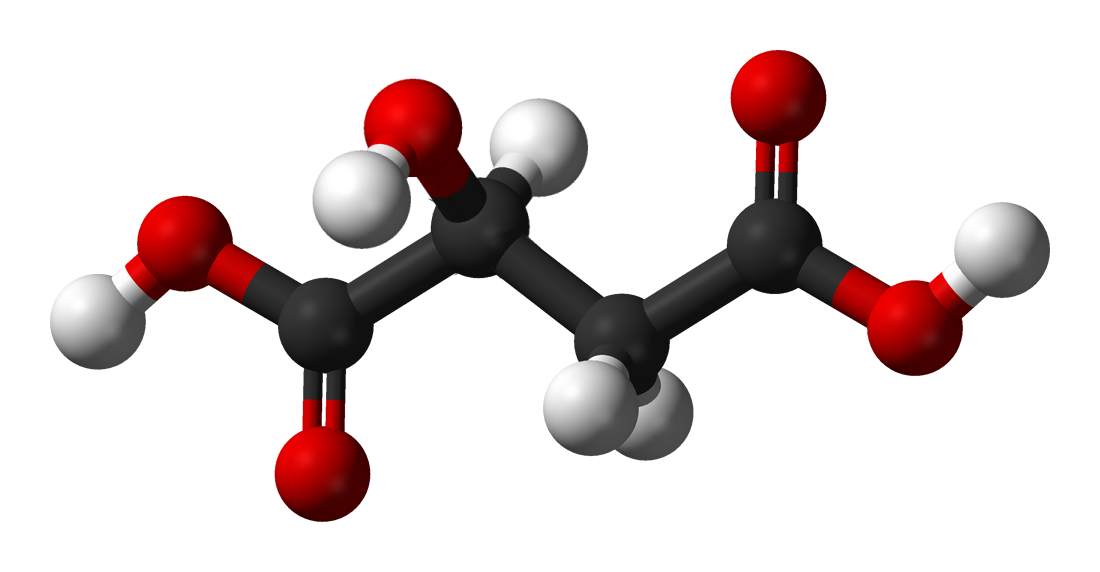
- Ball-and-stick model

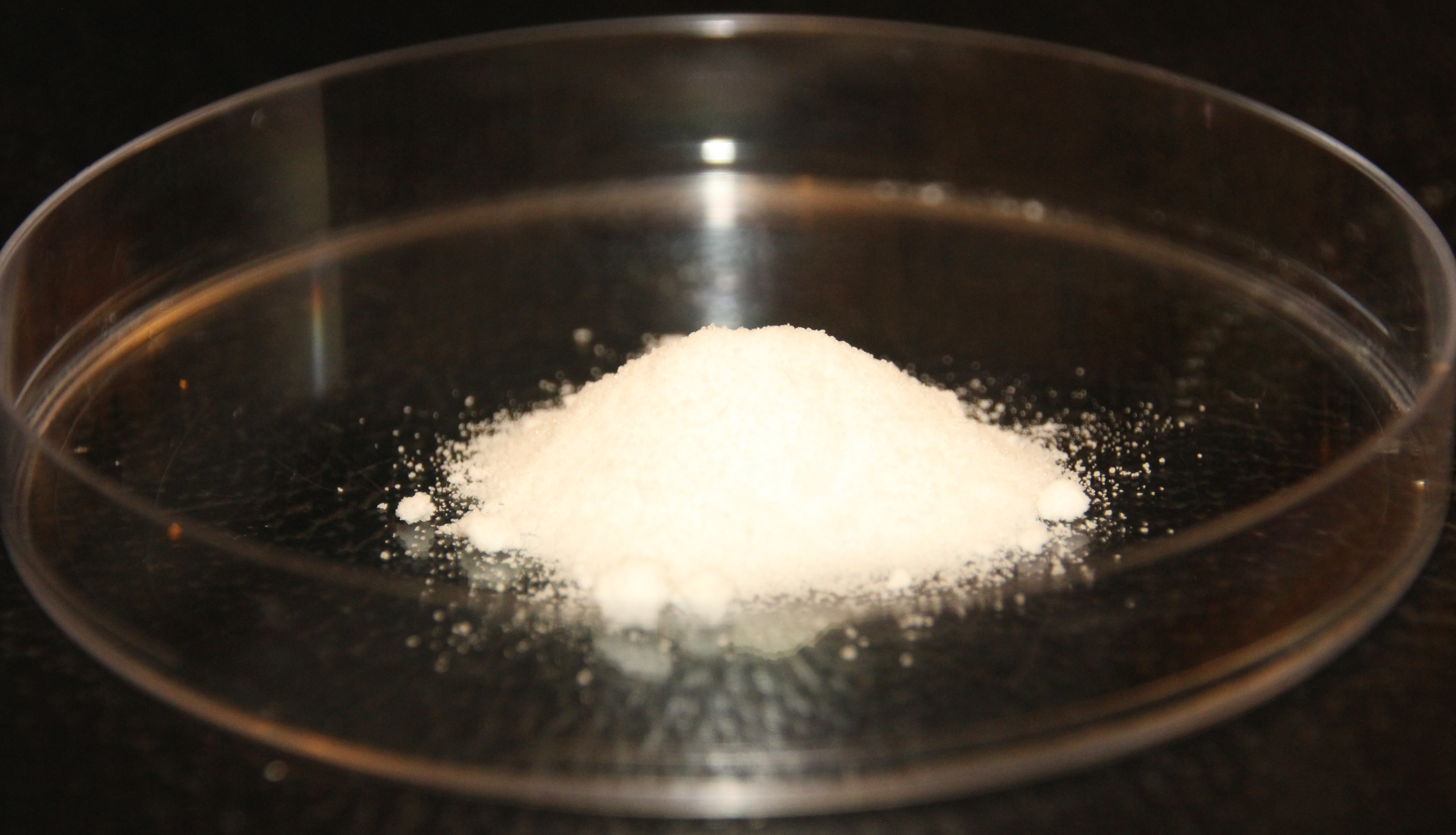
- DL-Malic acid

Names
- Preferred IUPAC name 2-Hydroxybutanedioic acid
- Other names: Hydroxybutanedioic acid; 2-Hydroxysuccinic acid; (L/D)-Malic acid; (±)-Malic acid; (S/R)-Hydroxybutanedioic acid

Identifiers
CAS Number	6915-15-7
3D model (JSmol)	Interactive image
ChEBI	CHEBI:6650; CHEBI:30796 D-(+); CHEBI:30797 L-(–)
ChEMBL	ChEMBL1455497
ChemSpider	510; 83793 D-(+)-malic acid; 193317 L-(–)-malic acid
ECHA InfoCard	100.027.293
EC Number	230-022-8
E number	E296 (preservatives)
IUPHAR/BPS	2480
KEGG	C00711; C00497 D-(+); C00149 L-(–)
PubChem CID	525; 92824 D-(+); 222656 L-(–)
UNII	817L1N4CKP
CompTox Dashboard (EPA)	DTXSID0027640
- InChI: InChI=1S/C4H6O5/c5-2(4(8)9)1-3(6)7/h2,5H,1H2,(H,6,7)(H,8,9) Key: BJEPYKJPYRNKOW-UHFFFAOYSA-N; InChI=1/C4H6O5/c5-2(4(8)9)1-3(6)7/h2,5H,1H2,(H,6,7)(H,8,9) Key: BJEPYKJPYRNKOW-UHFFFAOYAM
- SMILES: O=C(O)CC(O)C(=O)O

Properties
Chemical formula	C_{4}H_{6}O_{5}
Molar mass	134.087 g·mol^{−1}
Appearance	Colorless
Density	1.609 g⋅cm^{−3}
Melting point	130 °C (266 °F; 403 K)
Solubility in water	558 g/L (at 20 °C)
Acidity (pK_{a})	pK_{a1} = 3.40 pK_{a2} = 5.20 pK_{a3} = 14.5

Hazards
- GHS labelling
Pictograms	(GHS07: Exclamation mark)
Flash point	203 °C

Related compounds
Other anions	Malate
Related carboxylic acids	Succinic acid Tartaric acid Fumaric acid
Related compounds	Butanol; Butyraldehyde; Crotonaldehyde; Sodium malate
- Except where otherwise noted, data are given for materials in their standard state (at 25 °C [77 °F], 100 kPa). verify (what is ?) Infobox references

Malic acid is an organic compound with the molecular formula HO_{2}CCH(OH)CH_{2}CO_{2}H. It is a dicarboxylic acid that is made by all living organisms, contributes to the sour taste of fruits, and is used as a food additive. Malic acid has two stereoisomeric forms (L- and D-enantiomers), though only the L-isomer exists naturally. The salts and esters of malic acid are known as malates. The malate anion is a metabolic intermediate in the citric acid cycle.

== Etymology ==
The word 'malic' is derived from Latin mālum, meaning 'apple'. The related Latin word mālus, meaning 'apple tree', is used as the name of the genus Malus, which includes all apples and crabapples; and is the origin of other taxonomic classifications such as Maloideae, Malinae, and Maleae.

== Biochemistry ==
L-Malic acid is the naturally occurring form, whereas a mixture of L- and D-malic acid is produced synthetically.

L-Malic acid (S)

D-Malic acid (R)

Malate plays an important role in biochemistry. In the C4 carbon fixation process, malate is a source of CO_{2} in the Calvin cycle. In the citric acid cycle, (S)-malate is an intermediate, formed by the addition of an -OH group on the si face of fumarate. It can also be formed from pyruvate via anaplerotic reactions.

Malate is also synthesized by the carboxylation of phosphoenolpyruvate in the guard cells of plant leaves. Malate, as a double anion, often accompanies potassium cations during the uptake of solutes into the guard cells in order to maintain electrical balance in the cell. The accumulation of these solutes within the guard cell decreases the solute potential, allowing water to enter the cell and promote aperture of the stomata.

== In food ==
Malic acid was first isolated from apple juice by Carl Wilhelm Scheele in 1785. Antoine Lavoisier in 1787 proposed the name acide malique, which is derived from the Latin word for apple, mālum—as is its genus name Malus. In German it is named Äpfelsäure (or Apfelsäure) after plural or singular of a sour thing from the apple fruit, but the salt(s) are called Malat(e). Malic acid is the main acid in many fruits, including apricots, blackberries, blueberries, cherries, grapes, mirabelles, peaches, pears, plums, and quince, and is present in lower concentrations in other fruits, such as citrus. It contributes to the sourness of unripe apples. Sour apples contain high proportions of the acid. It is present in grapes and in most wines with concentrations sometimes as high as 5 g/L. It confers a tart taste to wine; the amount decreases with increasing fruit ripeness. The taste of malic acid is very clear and pure in rhubarb, a plant for which it is the primary flavor. It is also the compound responsible for the tart flavor of sumac spice. It is also a component of some artificial vinegar flavors, such as "salt and vinegar" flavored potato chips.

The process of malolactic fermentation converts malic acid to much milder lactic acid. Malic acid occurs naturally in all fruits and many vegetables, and is generated in fruit metabolism.

Malic acid, when added to food products, is denoted by E number E296. It is sometimes used with or in place of the less sour citric acid in sour sweets. These sweets are sometimes labeled with a warning stating that excessive consumption can cause irritation of the mouth. It is approved for use as a food additive in the EU, US and Australia and New Zealand (where it is listed by its INS number 296).

Malic acid contains 10 kJ (2.39 kilocalories) of energy per gram.

== Production and main reactions ==
Racemic malic acid is produced industrially by the double hydration of maleic anhydride. In 2000, American production capacity was 5,000 tons per year. The enantiomers may be separated by chiral resolution of the racemic mixture. S-Malic acid is obtained by fermentation of fumaric acid.

Self-condensation of malic acid in the presence of fuming sulfuric acid gives the pyrone coumalic acid:

2 HO_{2}CCH(OH)CH_{2}CO_{2}H → HO_{2}CC_{4}H_{3}O_{2} + 2 CO + 4 H_{2}O

Carbon monoxide and water are liberated during this reaction.

Malic acid was important in the discovery of the Walden inversion and the Walden cycle, in which (−)-malic acid first is converted into (+)-chlorosuccinic acid by action of phosphorus pentachloride. Wet silver oxide then converts the chlorine compound to (+)-malic acid, which then reacts with PCl_{5} to the (−)-chlorosuccinic acid. The cycle is completed when silver oxide takes this compound back to (−)-malic acid.

l-malic acid is used to resolve α-phenylethylamine, a versatile resolving agent in its own right.

== Plant defense ==
Soil supplementation with molasses increases microbial synthesis of malic acid. This is thought to occur naturally as part of soil microbe suppression of disease, so soil amendment with molasses can be used as a crop treatment in horticulture.

== Interactive pathway map ==
Click on genes, proteins and metabolites below to link to respective articles. (Note: The interactive pathway map can be edited at WikiPathways: "GlycolysisGluconeogenesis_WP534".)

Glycolysis and Gluconeogenesis edit

== See also ==
- Acids in wine
- Citrate–malate shuttle
- Crassulacean acid metabolism
- Malate–aspartate shuttle
- Maleic acid, resulting from malic acid dehydration
