= 1-Phenylethylamine =

- Chemical structure of 1-Phenylethylamine

Names
- Preferred IUPAC name 1-Phenylethan-1-amine
- Other names: 1-Phenylethylamine; α-Phenylethylamine; α-Methylbenzylamine; 1-PEA; α-PEA

Identifiers
| CAS Number | 618-36-0 (R/S); 3886-69-9 (R)-(+); 2627-86-3 (S)-(−) |
| 3D model (JSmol) | (R/S): Interactive image; (R)-(+): Interactive image; (S)-(−): Interactive image |
| ChEBI | CHEBI:670 |
| ChEMBL | ChEMBL278059 |
| ChemSpider | 7130 |
| ECHA InfoCard | 100.009.588 |
| KEGG | C02455 |
| PubChem CID | 7408 (R/S); 643189 (R)-(+); 75818 (S)-(−) |
| UNII | HZ9DM6B2MT (R/S); V022ZK8GZ5 (R)-(+); 05780F90V3 (S)-(−) |
| CompTox Dashboard (EPA) | DTXSID40862301 |
- InChI: InChI=1S/C8H11N/c1-7(9)8-5-3-2-4-6-8/h2-7H,9H2,1H3 Key: RQEUFEKYXDPUSK-UHFFFAOYSA-N; (R/S): InChI=1S/C8H11N/c1-7(9)8-5-3-2-4-6-8/h2-7H,9H2,1H3 Key: RQEUFEKYXDPUSK-UHFFFAOYSA-N; (R)-(+): InChI=1S/C8H11N/c1-7(9)8-5-3-2-4-6-8/h2-7H,9H2,1H3/t7-/m1/s1 Key: RQEUFEKYXDPUSK-SSDOTTSWSA-N; (S)-(−): InChI=1S/C8H11N/c1-7(9)8-5-3-2-4-6-8/h2-7H,9H2,1H3/t7-/m0/s1 Key: RQEUFEKYXDPUSK-ZETCQYMHSA-N
- SMILES: (R/S): CC(C1=CC=CC=C1)N; (R)-(+): C[C@H](C1=CC=CC=C1)N; (S)-(−): C[C@@H](C1=CC=CC=C1)N

Properties
| Chemical formula | C_{8}H_{11}N |
| Molar mass | 121.183 g·mol^{−1} |
| Density | 0.94 g/mL |
| Melting point | −65 °C |
| Boiling point | 187 °C (369 °F; 460 K) |

Hazards
- Occupational safety and health (OHS/OSH)
| Main hazards | Corrosive |

Related compounds
| Related stereoisomers | (R)-(+)- (CAS [3886-69-9]) (S)-(−)- (CAS [2627-86-3]) |
- Except where otherwise noted, data are given for materials in their standard state (at 25 °C [77 °F], 100 kPa). verify (what is ?) Infobox references

1-Phenylethylamine (1-PEA or α-PEA), also known as α-methylbenzylamine, is the organic compound with the formula C_{6}H_{5}CH(NH_{2})CH_{3}. This primary amine is a colorless liquid is often used in chiral resolutions. Like benzylamine, it is relatively basic and forms stable ammonium salts and imines.

== Preparation and optical resolution ==
1-Phenylethylamine may be prepared by the reductive amination of acetophenone:

C_{6}H_{5}C(O)CH_{3} + NH_{3} + H_{2} → C_{6}H_{5}CH(NH_{2})CH_{3} + H_{2}O

The Leuckart reaction, using ammonium formate, is another method for this transformation.

l-malic acid, a versatile resolving agent in its own right, is used to resolve 1-Phenylethylamine. The dextrorotatory enantiomer crystallizes with the malate, leaving the levorotatory form in solution.

== Pharmacology ==
Similarly to benzylamine and analogues like pargyline, 1-phenylethylamine has been found to act as a very weak monoamine oxidase inhibitor (MAOI), as well as an inhibitor of semicarbazide-sensitive amine oxidase (SSAO).

== See also ==
- 2-Phenylethylamine
