= Diisopropyl tartrate =

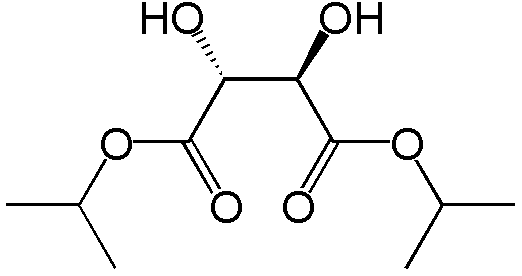

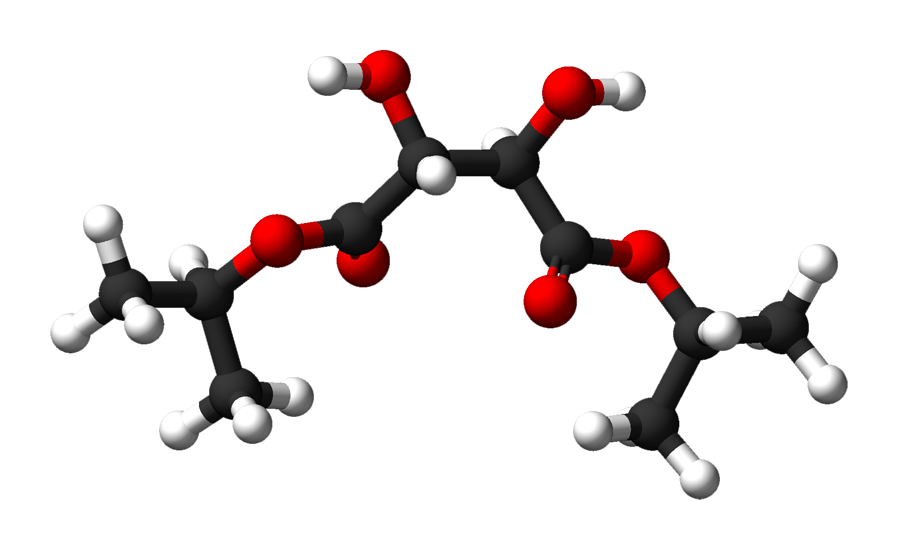

Names
- IUPAC name Di(propan-2-yl) 2,3-dihydroxybutanedioate
- Other names Diisopropyl 2,3-dihydroxysuccinate Diisopropyl tartrate Bis(1-methylethyl) ester of 2,3-dihydroxybutanedioic acid DIPT

Identifiers
CAS Number	2217-15-4
3D model (JSmol)	(−)-isomer: Interactive image; Interactive image
ChemSpider	101254 (−)-isomer
ECHA InfoCard	100.017.009
EC Number	218-709-0
PubChem CID	102768 (−)-isomer; 112972
UNII	7Z907X7UEY
CompTox Dashboard (EPA)	DTXSID00870947
- InChI: InChI=1S/C10H18O6/c1-5(2)15-9(13)7(11)8(12)10(14)16-6(3)4/h5-8,11-12H,1-4H3/t7-,8-/m0/s1 Key: XEBCWEDRGPSHQH-YUMQZZPRSA-N
- SMILES: (−)-isomer: CC(C)OC(=O)C(C(C(=O)OC(C)C)O)O; O=C(OC(C)C)[C@@H](O)[C@H](O)C(=O)OC(C)C

Properties
Chemical formula	C_{10}H_{18}O_{6}
Molar mass	234.25 g/mol
Density	1.117 g/mL
Boiling point	152 °C (306 °F; 425 K) at 16 kPa
- Except where otherwise noted, data are given for materials in their standard state (at 25 °C [77 °F], 100 kPa). verify (what is ?) Infobox references

Diisopropyl tartrate (DIPT) is a diester of tartaric acid. It has a two chiral carbon atoms giving rise to three stereoisomeric variants. It is commonly used in asymmetric synthesis as a catalyst and as chiral building block for pharmaceuticals and agrochemicals. Its main application is in Sharpless epoxidation, where it serves as a chiral ligand to titanium after reaction with titanium isopropoxide.
