= Arthrobacter pascens =

Scientific classification
- Domain: Bacteria
- Kingdom: Bacillati
- Phylum: Actinomycetota
- Class: Actinomycetia
- Order: Micrococcales
- Family: Micrococcaceae
- Genus: Arthrobacter
- Species: A. pascens

Binomial name
- Arthrobacter pascens Lochhead and Burton 1953 (Approved Lists 1980)

Type strain
- ATCC 13346; CCUG 23843; CIP 102362; DSM 20545

Species of bacterium

Arthrobacter pascens is a bacterium species from the genus of Arthrobacter which occurs in soil. Arthrobacter pascens produces arthrobactin, porphyrins and choline oxidase.
