= Chiral resolution =

Separation of a sample of a chiral compound into its enantiomers

Chiral resolution, or enantiomeric resolution, is a process in stereochemistry for the separation of racemic mixture into their enantiomers. It is an important tool in the production of optically active compounds, including drugs. Another term with the same meaning is optical resolution.

The use of chiral resolution to obtain enantiomerically pure compounds has the disadvantage of necessarily discarding at least half of the starting racemic mixture. Asymmetric synthesis of one of the enantiomers is one means of avoiding this waste.

== Crystallization of diastereomeric salts ==
Steps in classic chiral resolution of amines

The most common method for chiral resolution involves conversion of the racemic mixture to a pair of diastereomeric derivatives by reacting them with chiral derivatizing agents, also known as chiral resolving agents. The derivatives which are then separated by conventional crystallization, and converted back to the enantiomers by removal of the resolving agent. The process can be laborious and depends on the divergent solubilities of the diastereomers, which is difficult to predict. Often the less soluble diastereomer is targeted and the other is discarded or racemized for reuse. It is common to test several resolving agents. Typical derivatization involves salt formation between an amine and a carboxylic acid. Simple deprotonation then yields back the pure enantiomer. Examples of chiral derivatizing agents are tartaric acid and the amine brucine. The method was introduced (again) by Louis Pasteur in 1853 by resolving racemic tartaric acid with optically active (+)-cinchotoxine.

In some cases, only 0.5 equivalents of a chiral acid or base are reqiured.

=== Common resolving agents ===
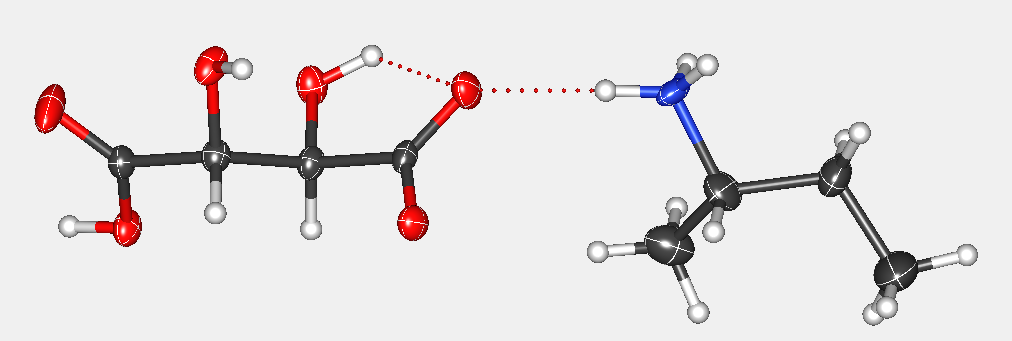
Structure of the tartrate salt of 2-butylammonium, showing extensive hydrogen bonding. Color code: blue = N, red = O.

The chiral pool consists of widely available resolving agents. They are always natural products or derived from them.

- Tartaric acid, an acid that forms diastereomeric salts with chiral amines
- Antimony potassium tartrate, an anion, that forms diastereomeric salts with chiral cations.
- Mandelic acid, an acid that forms diastereomeric salts with chiral amines.
- Camphorsulfonic acid, an acid that forms diastereomeric salts with chiral amines. Also 3-bromocamphor-8-sulfonic acid
- 1-Phenylethylamine, a base that forms diastereomeric salts with chiral acids. Many related chiral amines have been demonstrated.

== Spontaneous resolution and related specialized techniques ==
Via the process known as spontaneous resolution, 5-10% of all racemates crystallize as mixtures of enantiopure crystals. This phenomenon allowed Louis Pasteur to separate left-handed and right-handed sodium ammonium tartrate crystals. These experiments underpinned his discovery of optical activity. In 1882 he went on to demonstrate that by seeding a supersaturated solution of sodium ammonium tartrate with a d-crystal on one side of the reactor and a l-crystal on the opposite side, crystals of opposite handedness will form on the opposite sides of the reactor.

Spontaneous resolution has also been demonstrated with racemic methadone. In a typical setup 50 grams dl-methadone is dissolved in petroleum ether and concentrated. Two millimeter-sized d- and l-crystals are added and after stirring for 125 hours at 40 °C two large d- and l-crystals are recovered in 50% yield.

Another form of direct crystallization is preferential crystallization also called resolution by entrainment of one of the enantiomers. For example, seed crystals of (−)-hydrobenzoin induce crystallization of this enantiomer from an ethanol solution of (±)-hydrobenzoin.

== Chiral column chromatography ==
In chiral column chromatography the stationary phase is made chiral with similar resolving agents as described above.
