= Tartrate =

- Tartrate structural formula

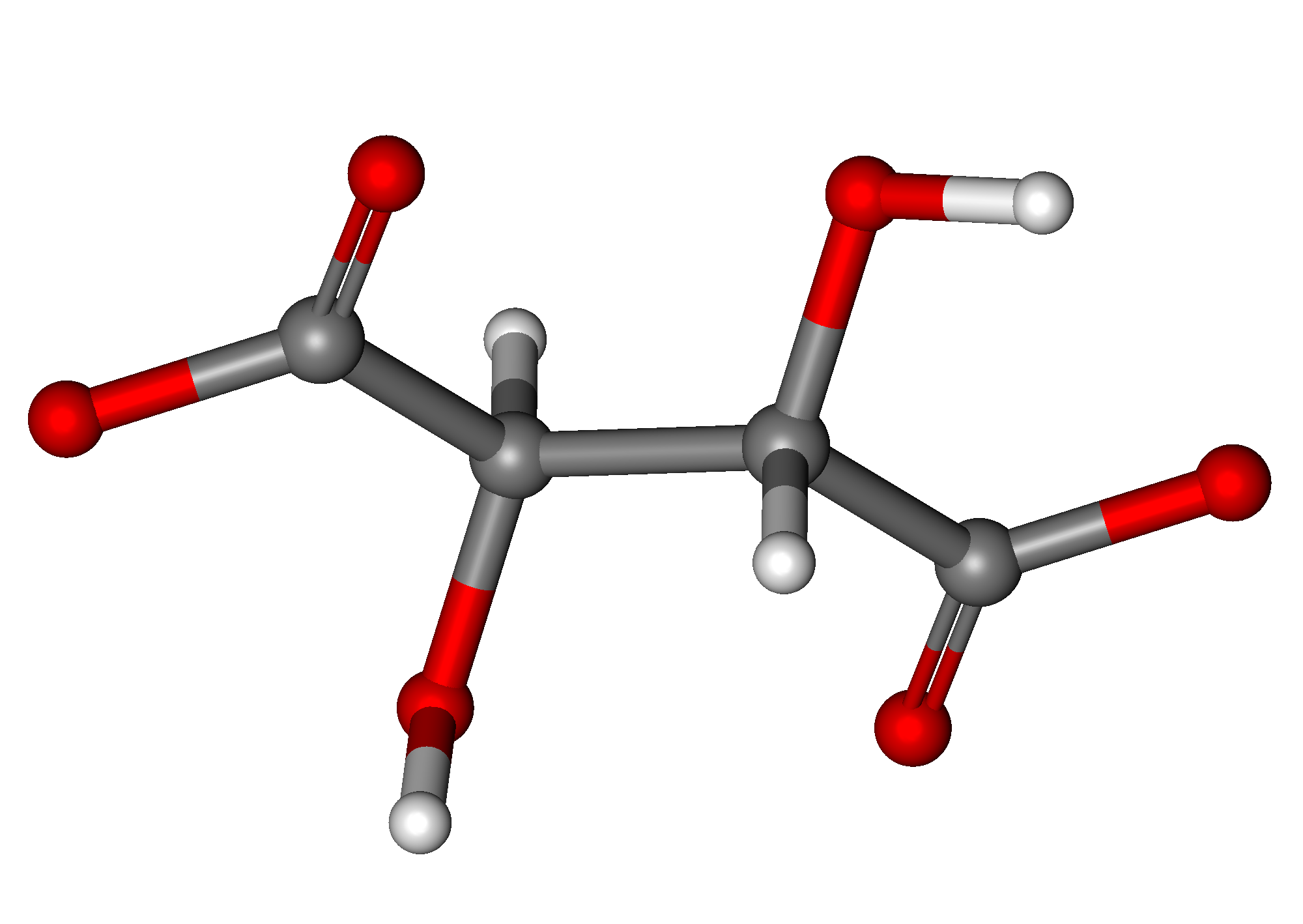

Identifiers
CAS Number	64672-61-3
3D model (JSmol)	Interactive image
ChEBI	CHEBI:30929
ChemSpider	3033168
PubChem CID	3806114
UNII	GBG3U2YP5Y
- InChI: InChI=1S/C4H6O6/c5-1(3(7)8)2(6)4(9)10/h1-2,5-6H,(H,7,8)(H,9,10)/p-2 Key: FEWJPZIEWOKRBE-UHFFFAOYSA-L; InChI=1/C4H6O6/c5-1(3(7)8)2(6)4(9)10/h1-2,5-6H,(H,7,8)(H,9,10)/p-2 Key: FEWJPZIEWOKRBE-NUQVWONBAJ
- SMILES: O=C([O-])C(O)C(O)C([O-])=O

Properties
Chemical formula	C_{4}H_{4}O_{6}^{2−}
Molar mass	148.07 g/mol
Conjugate acid	Bitartrate
- Except where otherwise noted, data are given for materials in their standard state (at 25 °C [77 °F], 100 kPa). verify (what is ?) Infobox references

A tartrate is a salt or ester of the organic compound tartaric acid, a dicarboxylic acid. The formula of the tartrate dianion is O^{−}OC-CH(OH)-CH(OH)-COO^{−} or C_{4}H_{4}O_{6}^{2−}.

The main forms of tartrates used commercially are pure crystalline tartaric acid used as an acidulant in non-alcoholic drinks and foods, cream of tartar used in baking, and Rochelle salt, commonly used in electroplating solutions.

== As food additives ==
As food additives, tartrates are used as antioxidants, acidity regulators, and emulsifiers. Examples include

- sodium tartrates (E335)
  - monosodium tartrate
  - sodium tartrate
  - sodium ammonium tartrate the compound through which Louis Pasteur discovered chirality
- potassium tartrates (E336)
  - potassium bitartrate (monopotassium tartrate, cream of tartar)
  - potassium tartrate
- potassium sodium tartrate (E337)
- calcium tartrate (E354, used as emulsifier)
- stearyl tartrate (E483, used as emulsifier)

== In wine ==
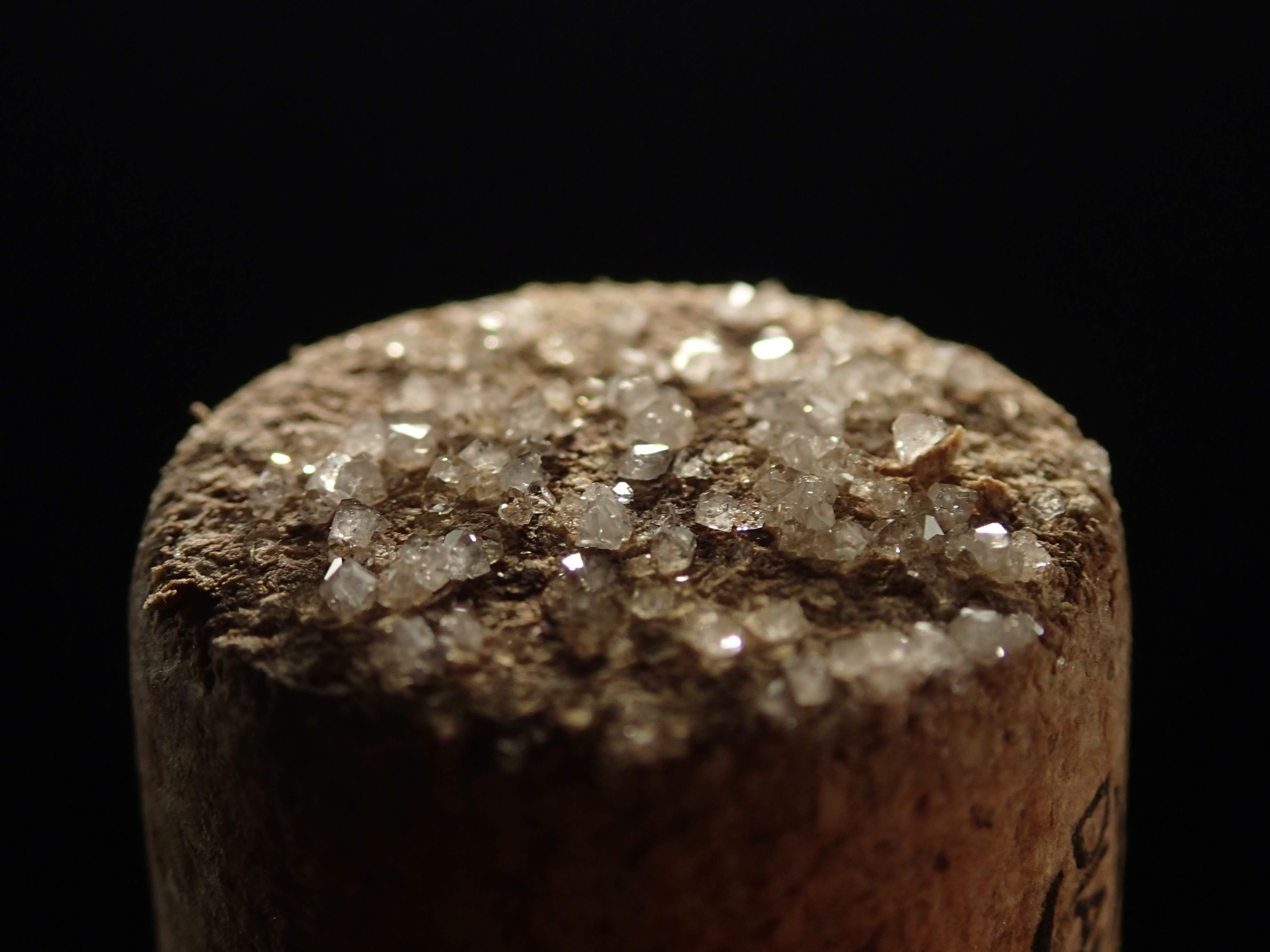
Tartrate crystals on a cork

In wine, tartrates are the harmless crystalline deposits that separate from wines during fermentation and aging. The principal component of this deposit is potassium bitartrate, a potassium salt of tartaric acid. Small amounts of pulp debris, dead yeast, and precipitated phenolic materials such as tannins make up the impurities contaminating the potassium acid tartrate.

The wine industry is the only source of commercial tartrates, and the crystalline encrustations left inside fermentation vessels are regularly scraped off and purified for commercial use.

Tartrates separate from new wines because they are less soluble in alcohol than in non-alcoholic grape juice. The exact figures vary according to variety and region, but approximately half of the tartrate soluble in grape juice is insoluble in wine. The problem is that the tartrate may remain in a supersaturated state after bottling, only to crystallize at some unpredictable later time.

Tartrates precipitated in red wine usually take on some red pigment and are commonly dismissed as mere sediment; in white wines they can look alarmingly like shards of glass. The modern wine industry has decided that tartrate stabilization is preferable to consumer education.

== As concrete admixture ==
Tartrate is also used as a retarder to delay the setting time of concrete when temperature is too high.
