= Hydroxymalonate dehydrogenase =

hydroxymalonate dehydrogenase

Identifiers
- EC no.: 1.1.1.167
- CAS no.: 58693-60-0

Databases
- IntEnz: IntEnz view
- BRENDA: BRENDA entry
- ExPASy: NiceZyme view
- KEGG: KEGG entry
- MetaCyc: metabolic pathway
- PRIAM: profile
- PDB structures: RCSB PDB PDBe PDBsum
- Gene Ontology: AmiGO / QuickGO
Search
- PMC: articles
- PubMed: articles
- NCBI: proteins

In enzymology, a hydroxymalonate dehydrogenase (EC 1.1.1.167) is an enzyme that catalyzes the chemical reaction

tartronic acid
+ NAD^{+}
H^{+}
H^{+}
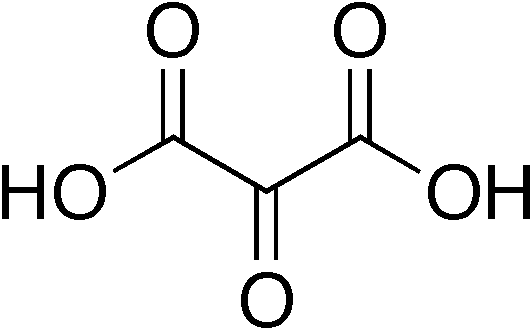
mesoxalic acid
+ NADH

The two substrates of this enzyme are tartronic acid and oxidised nicotinamide adenine dinucleotide (NAD^{+}). Its products are mesoxalic acid, reduced NADH, and a proton.

This enzyme belongs to the family of oxidoreductases, specifically those acting on the CH-OH group of donor with NAD^{+} or NADP^{+} as acceptor. The systematic name of this enzyme class is hydroxymalonate:NAD^{+} oxidoreductase.
