= Tartrate decarboxylase =

Class of enzymes

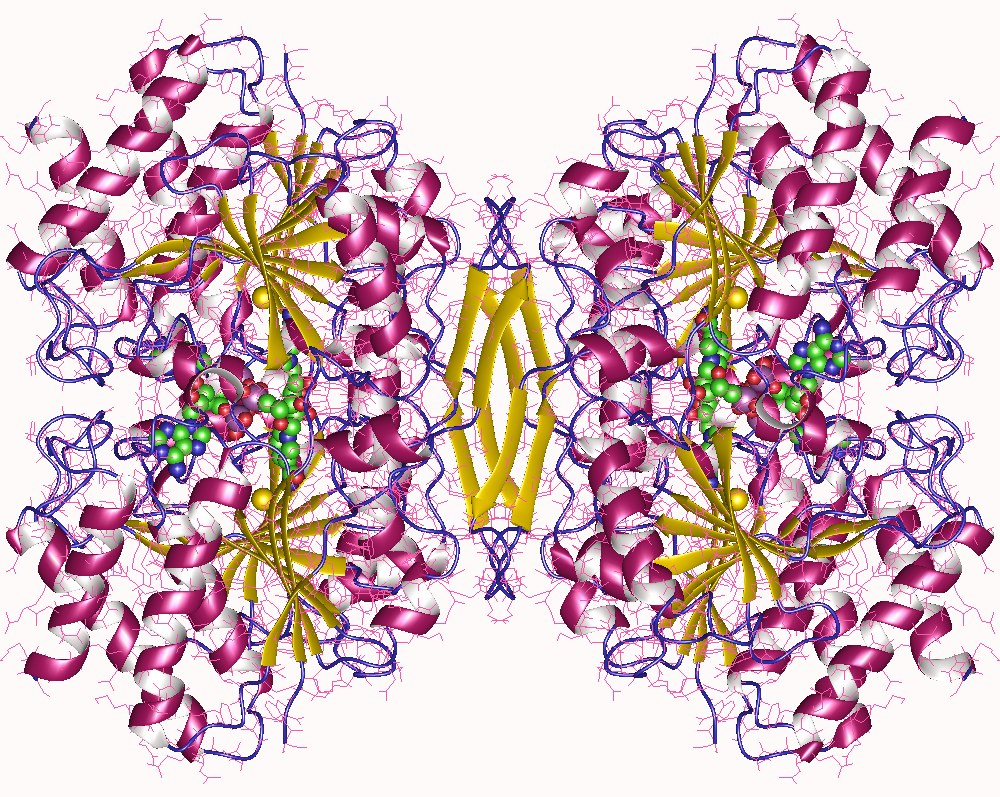
- Tartrate decarboxylase tetramer, Pseudomonas putida

Identifiers
- EC no.: 4.1.1.73
- CAS no.: 124248-30-2

Databases
- BRENDA: enzyme data
- ExPASy: NiceZyme view
- KEGG: enzyme entry
- MetaCyc: metabolic pathway
- Rhea: reactions
- PDB structures: RCSB PDB PDBe PDBsum
- Gene Ontology: AmiGO / QuickGO
Search
- PMC: articles
- PubMed: articles
- NCBI: proteins

Tartrate decarboxylase (EC 4.1.1.73) is an enzyme characterised from a Pseudomonas species that catalyzes the decarboxylation of L-tartaric acid to D-glyceric acid and carbon dioxide:

L-tartaric acid
CO_{2}
D-glyceric acid

The reaction is a significant part of the metabolism of tartaric acid.

This enzyme is a lyase, specifically a carboxy-lyase, which cleave carbon-carbon bonds. The systematic name of this enzyme class is (R,R)-tartrate carboxy-lyase (D-glycerate-forming). This enzyme is also called (R,R)-tartrate carboxy-lyase.
