= Bitartrate =

Bitartrate anion

Names
- Preferred IUPAC name 3-Carboxy-2,3-dihydroxypropanoate
- Other names: Bitartrate; Butanedioic acid, 2,3-dihydroxy-, ion(1−); 3-Carboxylato-2,3-dihydroxypropionic acid; Hydrogen tartrate; 2,3,4-Trihydroxy-4-oxobutanoate; 2,3,4-Trihydroxy-4-oxobutyric acidanion

Identifiers
3D model (JSmol)	: Interactive image; : Interactive image
Beilstein Reference	3905887
ChEBI	CHEBI:48929
ChemSpider	2900154
PubChem CID	3667129
- InChI: InChI=1S/C4H6O6/c5-1(3(7)8)2(6)4(9)10/h1-2,5-6H,(H,7,8)(H,9,10)/p-1 Key: FEWJPZIEWOKRBE-UHFFFAOYSA-M
- SMILES: : OC(C(O)C([O-])=O)C(O)=O; : C(C(C(=O)[O-])O)(C(=O)O)O

Properties
Chemical formula	C_{4}H_{5}O_{6}^{−}
Molar mass	149.079 g·mol^{−1}
Conjugate acid	Tartaric acid
Conjugate base	Tartrate
- Except where otherwise noted, data are given for materials in their standard state (at 25 °C [77 °F], 100 kPa). Infobox references

Bitartrate is an anion which is the conjugate base of tartaric acid. It may also refer to any salt or monoester of tartaric acid.

Some examples of bitartrate salts include:

- Choline bitartrate
- Cysteamine bitartrate
- Dihydrocodeine bitartrate
- Dimethylaminoethanol bitartrate
- Hydrocodone bitartrate
- Metaraminol bitartrate
- Norepinephrine bitartrate
- Potassium bitartrate
- Sodium bitartrate
