= Dihydroxymalonic acid =

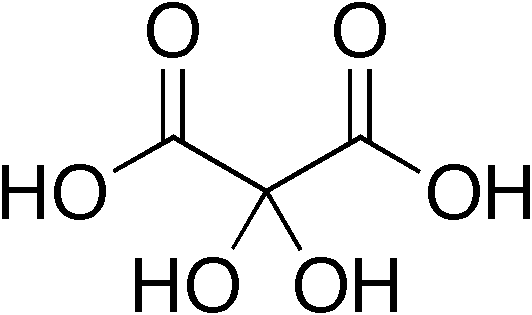

Names
- Preferred IUPAC name Dihydroxypropanedioic acid
- Other names Mesoxalic acid monohydrate Oxomalonic acid monohydrate Ketomalonic acid monohydrate

Identifiers
CAS Number	560-27-0
3D model (JSmol)	Interactive image; Interactive image
ChemSpider	61695
ECHA InfoCard	100.008.372
PubChem CID	68412
UNII	OT429C180H
CompTox Dashboard (EPA)	DTXSID70905078
- InChI: InChI=1S/C3H4O6/c4-1(5)3(8,9)2(6)7/h8-9H,(H,4,5)(H,6,7) Key: VUCKYGJSXHHQOJ-UHFFFAOYSA-N; InChI=1/C3H4O6/c4-1(5)3(8,9)2(6)7/h8-9H,(H,4,5)(H,6,7) Key: VUCKYGJSXHHQOJ-UHFFFAOYAF
- SMILES: C(=O)(C(C(=O)O)(O)O)O; O=C(O)C(O)(O)C(=O)O

Properties
Chemical formula	C_{3}H_{4}O_{6}
Molar mass	136.059 g·mol^{−1}
Melting point	119 to 120 °C (246 to 248 °F; 392 to 393 K)
- Except where otherwise noted, data are given for materials in their standard state (at 25 °C [77 °F], 100 kPa). verify (what is ?) Infobox references

Dihydroxymalonic acid is an organic compound with formula C_{3}H_{4}O_{6} or HO-(C=O)-C(OH)_{2}-(C=O)-OH, found in some plants such as alfalfa and in beet molasses.

The compound is also called dihydroxymesoxalic acid and dihydroxypropanedioic acid. It can be viewed as a hydrate derivative of mesoxalic acid, and is often called mesoxalic acid monohydrate and similar names. This compound is unusual in containing stable geminal hydroxy groups.

Dihydroxymalonic acid is a water-soluble white solid. It crystallizes in deliquescent prisms that melt between 113 °C and 121 °C without loss of water. It has been used in medical research as a hypoglycemic agent and was patented in the United States in 1997 as a fast-acting antidote to cyanide poisoning.

== Synthesis ==
Dihydroxymalonic acid can be obtained synthetically by hydrolysis of alloxan with baryta water, by warming caffuric acid with lead acetate solution, by electrolysis of tartaric acid in alkaline solution, or from glycerin diacetate and concentrated nitric acid in the cold. The product can be obtained also by oxidation of tartronic acid or glycerol.

== Reactions ==
Like typical hydrated ketonic acids, it is reduced in aqueous solution by sodium amalgam to tartronic acid, and also combines with phenylhydrazine and hydroxylamine. It reduces ammoniacal silver solutions. When heated with urea to 100 °C, it forms allantoin. By continued boiling of its aqueous solution it is decomposed into carbon dioxide and glyoxylic acid.

== See also ==
- Malonic acid
