= Alanine—oxomalonate transaminase =

Alanine-oxomalonate transaminase

Identifiers
- EC no.: 2.6.1.47
- CAS no.: 37277-96-6

Databases
- IntEnz: IntEnz view
- BRENDA: BRENDA entry
- ExPASy: NiceZyme view
- KEGG: KEGG entry
- MetaCyc: metabolic pathway
- PRIAM: profile
- PDB structures: RCSB PDB PDBe PDBsum
- Gene Ontology: AmiGO / QuickGO
Search
- PMC: articles
- PubMed: articles
- NCBI: proteins

Alanine-oxomalonate transaminase (EC 2.6.1.47) is a pyridoxal phosphate-dependent enzyme that catalyzes the chemical reaction

alanine
+
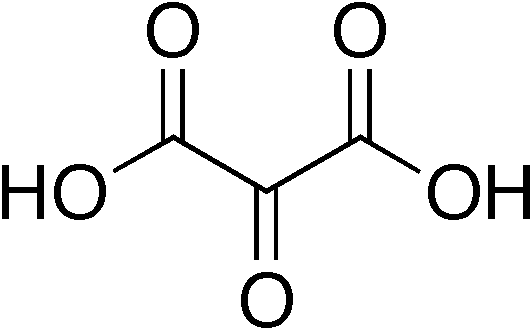
mesoxalic acid
pyruvic acid
+
2-aminopropanedioic acid

The two substrates of this enzyme characterised from silkworm are L-alanine and mesoxalic acid. Its products are pyruvic acid and 2-aminopropanedioic acid.

This enzyme is a transferase, specifically a transaminase, which transfer nitrogenous groups. The systematic name of this enzyme class is L-alanine:oxomalonate aminotransferase. Other names in common use include alanine-oxomalonate aminotransferase, L-alanine-ketomalonate transaminase, and alanine-ketomalonate (mesoxalate) transaminase.
