= 3-phosphoglycerate phosphatase =

Class of enzymes

Identifiers
- EC no.: 3.1.3.38
- CAS no.: 62213-13-2

Databases
- BRENDA: enzyme data
- ExPASy: NiceZyme view
- KEGG: enzyme entry
- MetaCyc: metabolic pathway
- Rhea: reactions
- PDB structures: RCSB PDB PDBe PDBsum
- Gene Ontology: AmiGO / QuickGO
Search
- PMC: articles
- PubMed: articles
- NCBI: proteins

The enzyme 3-phosphoglycerate phosphatase (EC 3.1.3.38) catalyzes the reaction

3-phospho-D-glyceric acid
H_{2}O
P_{i}
D-glyceric acid

The enzyme characterised from sugarcane and rice hydrolyses 3-phospho-D-glyceric acid to D-glyceric acid and orthophosphate. The reaction is part of the biosynthesis of the amino acid serine. The enzyme has also been studied as part of a sequence to manufacture fructose from starch waste products.

This enzyme is a hydrolase, specifically one acting on phosphoric monoester bonds. The systematic name is D-glycerate-3-phosphate phosphohydrolase. Other names in common use include D-3-Phosphoglycerate phosphatase, and 3-PGA phosphatase.
