= Potassium sodium tartrate =

Sodium potassium L(+)-tartrate tetrahydrate
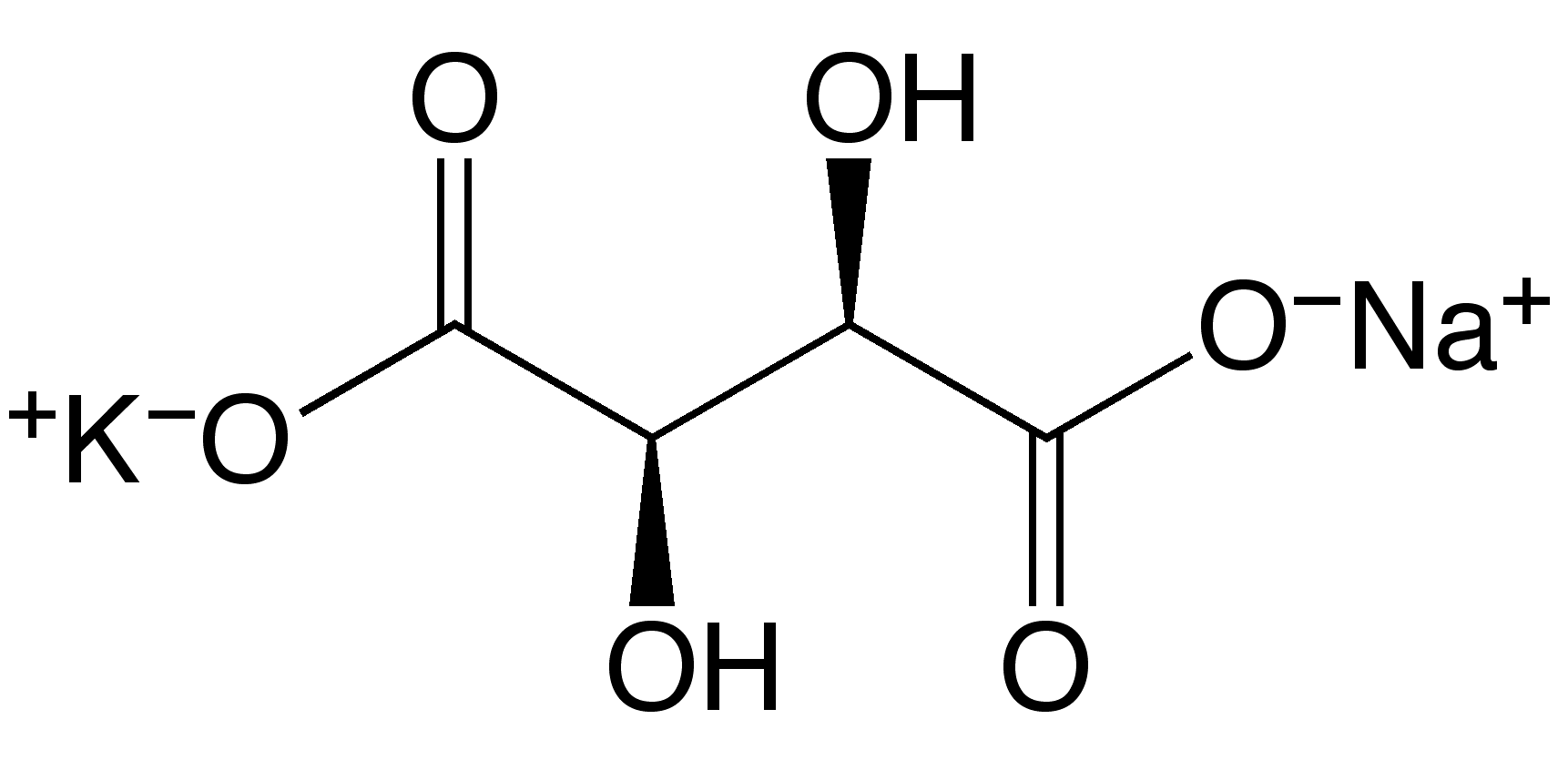
- Skeletal formula of potassium sodium tartrate

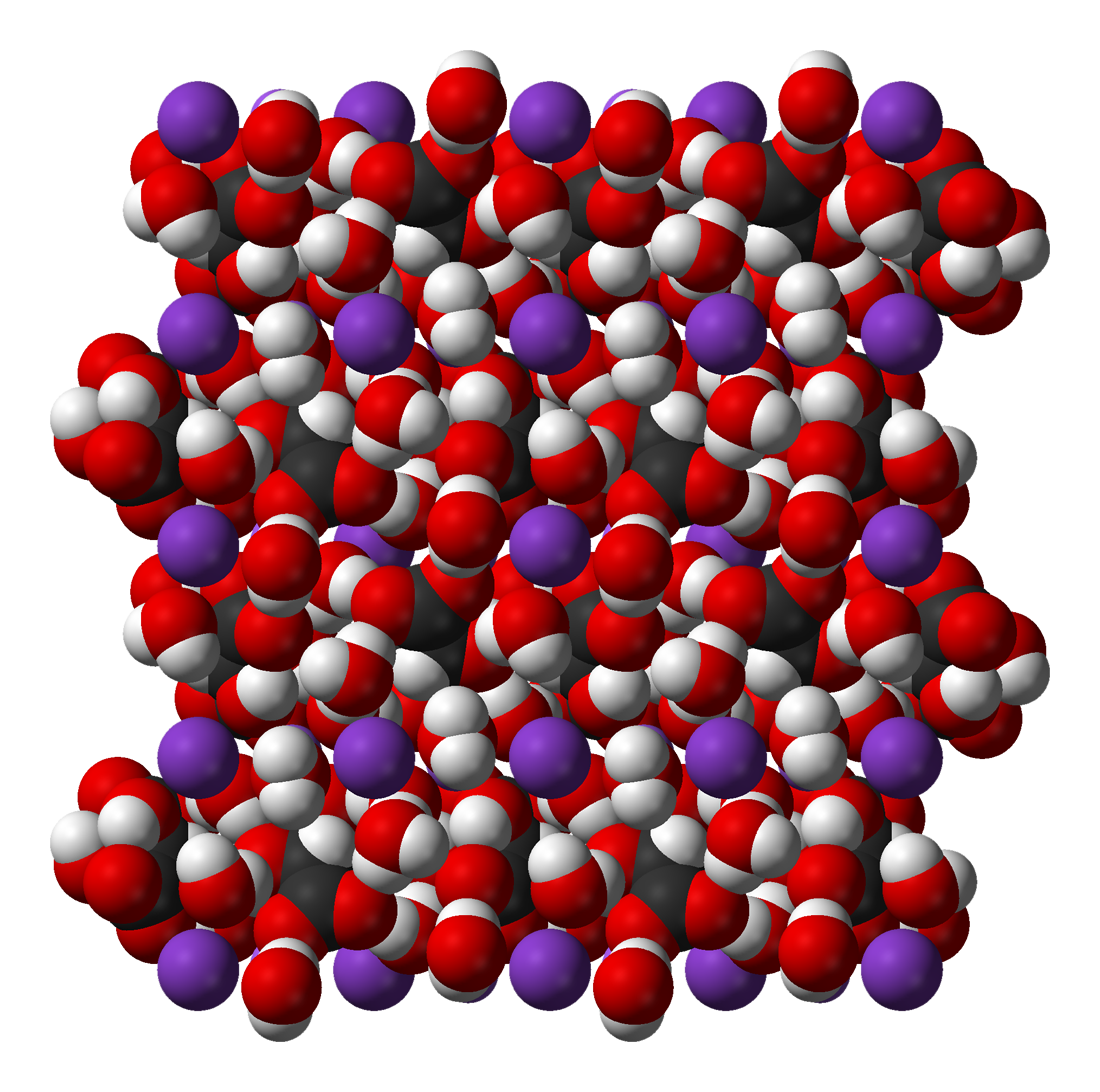
- Space-filling model of part of the crystal structure of potassium sodium tartrate

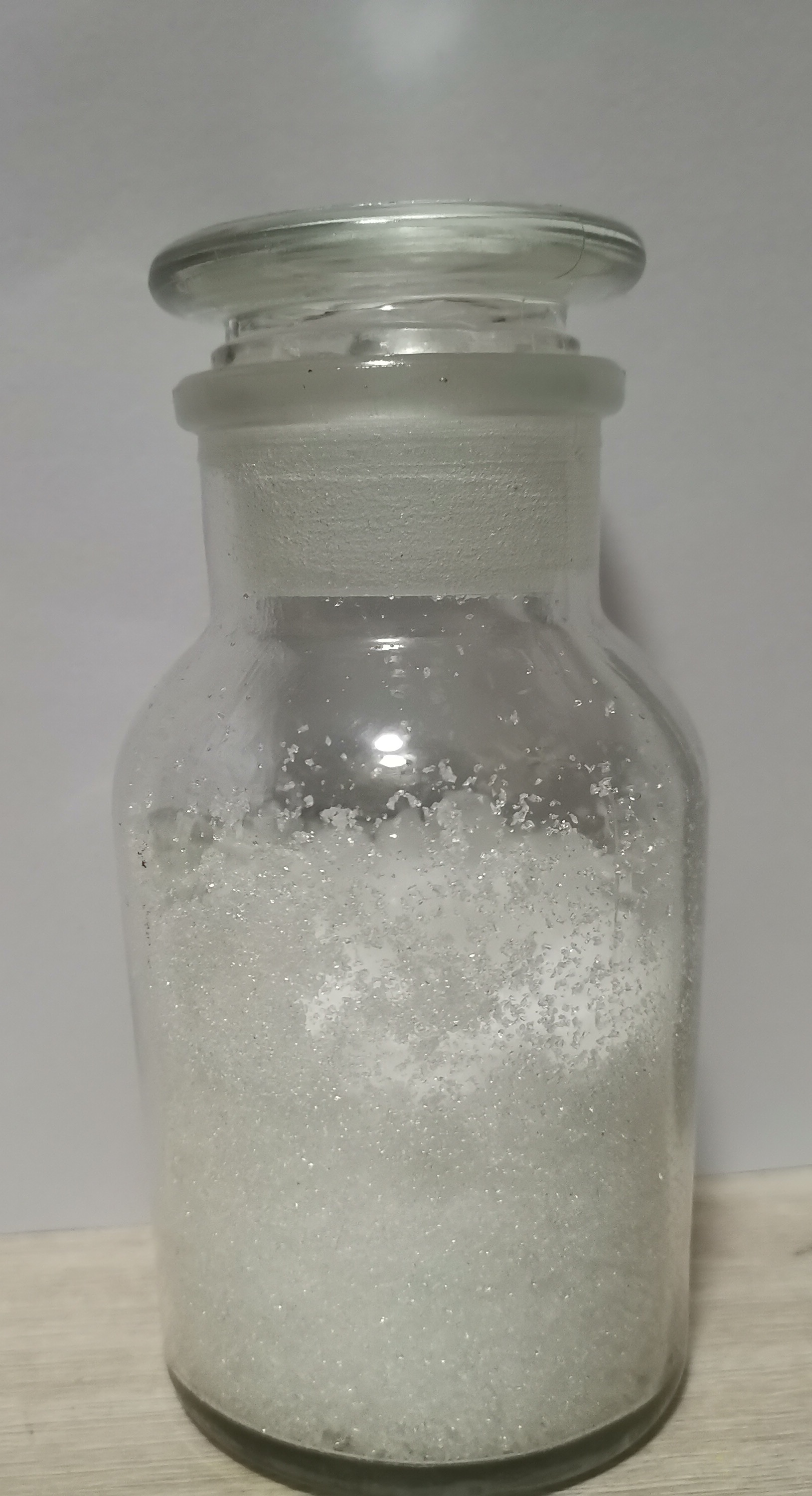
- Crystals of potassium sodium tartrate tetrahydrate Potassium sodium tartrate tetrahydrate

Names
- IUPAC name Sodium potassium L(+)-tartrate tetrahydrate
- Other names E337; Seignette's salt; Rochelle salt

Identifiers
CAS Number	304-59-6; 6381-59-5 (tetrahydrate)
3D model (JSmol)	Interactive image
ChemSpider	8031536
ECHA InfoCard	100.132.041
EC Number	206-156-8
E number	E337 (antioxidants, ...)
PubChem CID	9855836
UNII	P49F8NV7ES; QH257BPV3J (tetrahydrate)
CompTox Dashboard (EPA)	DTXSID20980375
- InChI: InChI=1S/C4H6O6.K.Na/c5-1(3(7)8)2(6)4(9)10;;/h1-2,5-6H,(H,7,8)(H,9,10);;/q;2*+1/p-2 Key: LJCNRYVRMXRIQR-UHFFFAOYSA-L; InChI=1/C4H6O6.K.Na/c5-1(3(7)8)2(6)4(9)10;;/h1-2,5-6H,(H,7,8)(H,9,10);;/q;2*+1/p-2 Key: LJCNRYVRMXRIQR-NUQVWONBAG
- SMILES: [K+].[Na+].O=C([O-])C(O)C(O)C([O-])=O

Properties
Chemical formula	KNaC_{4}H_{4}O_{6}·4H_{2}O
Molar mass	282.22 g/mol (tetrahydrate)
Appearance	large colorless monoclinic needles
Odor	odorless
Density	1.79 g/cm^{3}
Melting point	75 °C (167 °F; 348 K)
Boiling point	220 °C (428 °F; 493 K) anhydrous at 130 °C; decomposes at 220 °C
Solubility in water	26 g / 100 mL (0 °C); 66 g / 100 mL (26 °C)
Solubility in ethanol	insoluble

Structure
Crystal structure	orthorhombic

Related compounds
Related compounds	Acid potassium tartrate; Aluminum tartrate; Ammonium tartrate; Calcium tartrate; Metatartaric acid; Potassium antimonyl tartrate; Potassium tartrate; Sodium ammonium tartrate; Sodium tartrate
- Except where otherwise noted, data are given for materials in their standard state (at 25 °C [77 °F], 100 kPa). verify (what is ?) Infobox references

Potassium sodium tartrate tetrahydrate, also known as Rochelle salt, is a double salt of tartaric acid first prepared (in about 1675) by an apothecary, Élie Seignette, of La Rochelle, France. Potassium sodium tartrate and monopotassium phosphate were some of the early materials discovered to exhibit piezoelectricity. This property led to its extensive use in crystal phonograph cartridges, microphones and earpieces during the post-World War II consumer electronics boom of the mid-20th century. Such transducers had an exceptionally high output with typical pick-up cartridge outputs as much as 2 volts or more. Rochelle salt is deliquescent so any transducers based on the material deteriorated if stored in damp conditions.

It has been used medicinally as a laxative. It has also been used in the process of silvering mirrors. It is an ingredient of Fehling's solution (reagent for reducing sugars). It is used in electroplating, in electronics and piezoelectricity, and as a combustion accelerator in cigarette paper (similar to an oxidizer in pyrotechnics).

In organic synthesis, it is used in aqueous workups to break up emulsions, particularly for reactions in which an aluminium-based hydride reagent was used. Sodium potassium tartrate is also important in the food industry.

It is a common precipitant in protein crystallography and is also an ingredient in the Biuret reagent which is used to measure protein concentration. This ingredient maintains cupric ions in solution at an alkaline pH.

== Preparation ==
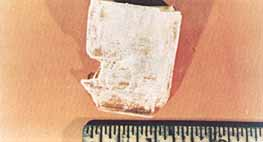
Large Rochelle salt crystal grown aboard Skylab

Larger crystals of Rochelle salt have been grown under conditions of reduced gravity and convection on board Skylab. Rochelle salt crystals will begin to dehydrate when the relative humidity drops to about 30% and will begin to dissolve at relative humidities above 84%.

== Piezoelectricity ==
In 1824, Sir David Brewster demonstrated piezoelectric effects using Rochelle salts, which led to him naming the effect pyroelectricity.

In 1919, Alexander McLean Nicolson worked with Rochelle salt, developing audio-related inventions like microphones and speakers at Bell Labs.

== Current applications ==
Rochelle salt-based composites have gained renewed interest for their applications in impact energy absorption and smart sensing technologies. Recent research has demonstrated the growth of Rochelle salt crystals within 3D-printed cuttlebone-inspired structures, resulting in multifunctional composites that combine mechanical robustness with piezoelectric properties. The chambered microstructure inspired by cuttlefish bone provides high stiffness and energy absorption capacity, making these composites suitable for protective equipment and structural health monitoring. The developed composites exhibit remarkable mechanical performance, with enhanced fracture toughness and resistance to impact. Under cyclic loading, they maintain consistent piezoelectric output for up to 7000 cycles. Impact tests show voltage outputs peaking at approximately 8 V, and a piezoelectric coefficient (d33) around 30 pC/N. These properties enable real-time sensing of impact forces, making the material suitable for use in wearable protective gear, such as smart armor for athletes and fall detection devices for the elderly. Sustainability and recyclability are notable advantages of this material. The Rochelle salt crystals can be dissolved and re-grown within the structure, allowing the composite to be repaired after damage. Recycled samples retain up to 95% of their original mechanical and piezoelectric performance. Potential applications extend to sports safety equipment, aerospace structures, military armor, and biomedical monitoring devices, highlighting the versatility and functionality of Rochelle salt composites in modern material science.
