= Meso-tartrate dehydrogenase =

Class of enzymes

meso-tartrate dehydrogenase

Identifiers
- EC no.: 1.3.1.7
- CAS no.: 37251-06-2

Databases
- IntEnz: IntEnz view
- BRENDA: BRENDA entry
- ExPASy: NiceZyme view
- KEGG: KEGG entry
- MetaCyc: metabolic pathway
- PRIAM: profile
- PDB structures: RCSB PDB PDBe PDBsum
- Gene Ontology: AmiGO / QuickGO
Search
- PMC: articles
- PubMed: articles
- NCBI: proteins

In enzymology, meso-tartrate dehydrogenase (EC 1.3.1.7) is an enzyme that catalyzes the chemical reaction

meso-tartaric acid
+ NAD^{+}
H^{+}
H^{+}
dihydroxyfumaric acid
+ NADH

The two substrates of this enzyme are meso-tartaric acid and oxidised nicotinamide adenine dinucleotide (NAD^{+}). Its products are dihydroxyfumaric acid, reduced NADH, and a proton.

This enzyme belongs to the family of oxidoreductases, specifically those acting on the CH-CH group of donor with NAD+ or NADP+ as acceptor. The systematic name of this enzyme class is meso-tartrate:NAD+ oxidoreductase. This enzyme participates in glyoxylic acid and dicarboxylic acid metabolism.
