= Oxaloglycolate reductase (decarboxylating) =

oxaloglycolate reductase (decarboxylating)

Identifiers
- EC no.: 1.1.1.92
- CAS no.: 37250-28-5

Databases
- IntEnz: IntEnz view
- BRENDA: BRENDA entry
- ExPASy: NiceZyme view
- KEGG: KEGG entry
- MetaCyc: metabolic pathway
- PRIAM: profile
- PDB structures: RCSB PDB PDBe PDBsum
- Gene Ontology: AmiGO / QuickGO
Search
- PMC: articles
- PubMed: articles
- NCBI: proteins

In enzymology, oxaloglycolate reductase (decarboxylating) (EC 1.1.1.92) is an enzyme that catalyzes the chemical reaction

D-glyceric acid
+ CO_{2} + NAD^{+}
H^{+}
H^{+}
2-hydroxy-3-oxosuccinic acid
+ NADH

The substrates of this enzyme are D-glyceric acid, oxidised nicotinamide adenine dinucleotide (NAD^{+}), and carbon dioxide. Its products are 2-hydroxy-3-oxosuccinic acid, reduced NADH, and a proton. The enzyme can use the alternative cofactor, nicotinamide adenine dinucleotide phosphate.

This enzyme belongs to the family of oxidoreductases, specifically those acting on the CH-OH group of donor with NAD^{+} or NADP^{+} as acceptor. The systematic name of this enzyme class is D-glycerate:NAD(P)^{+} oxidoreductase (carboxylating). This enzyme participates in glyoxylate and dicarboxylate metabolism.
