= C7H10O5 =

The molecular formula C_{7}H_{10}O_{5} may refer to:

- Diethyl oxomalonate, the diethyl ester of mesoxalic acid
- Shikimic acid, a cyclohexene, cyclitol, and cyclohexanecarboxylic acid
