= Diethyl oxomalonate =

Names
- Preferred IUPAC name Diethyl oxopropanedioate
- Other names Diethyl mesoxalate; Ethyl ketomalonate; Diethyl ketomalonate

Identifiers
CAS Number	609-09-6
3D model (JSmol)	Interactive image
ChemSpider	62322
ECHA InfoCard	100.009.252
EC Number	210-176-2
PubChem CID	69105
UNII	H28C8N13IK
CompTox Dashboard (EPA)	DTXSID5060566
- InChI: InChI=1S/C7H10O5/c1-3-11-6(9)5(8)7(10)12-4-2/h3-4H2,1-2H3 Key: DBKKFIIYQGGHJO-UHFFFAOYSA-N
- SMILES: CCOC(=O)C(=O)C(=O)OCC

Properties
Chemical formula	C_{7}H_{10}O_{5}
Molar mass	174.152 g·mol^{−1}
Appearance	Clear colorless to yellow liquid
Density	1.142 g/cm^{3}
Melting point	−30 °C (−22 °F; 243 K)
Boiling point	208–210 °C (406–410 °F; 481–483 K); 96–97 °C (12 mmHg)
Solubility in water	Highly soluble
Solubility in ethanol, diethylether, chloroform	Soluble

Hazards
- GHS labelling
Pictograms	(GHS07: Exclamation mark)
Signal word	Warning
Hazard statements	H315, H319, H335
Precautionary statements	P261, P264, P264+P265, P271, P280, P302+P352, P304+P340, P305+P351+P338, P319, P321, P332+P317, P337+P317, P362+P364, P403+P233, P405, P501

Related compounds
Related compounds	Oxaloacetic acid; α-Ketoglutaric acid; α-Ketoadipic acid
- Except where otherwise noted, data are given for materials in their standard state (at 25 °C [77 °F], 100 kPa). Infobox references

Diethyl oxomalonate is the diethyl ester of mesoxalic acid. It is a strong electrophile, with a highly polarized keto group active in addition and pericyclic reactions. The latter include oxa-Diels-Alder reactions and ene reactions. In humid air, diethyl mesoxalic forms a hydrate, the ketone being converted to an acetal. Physically, this means the anhydrous, green-yellow oil spontaneously converts to hydrated white crystals.

== Production and occurrence ==
In 1892, Richard Anschütz and co-workers first synthesized pure diethyl oxomalonate, pyrolyzing barium alloxandiide to oxomalonic acid, and then esterifying the product with acidic ethanol:

Synthese von Diethyl oxomalonate aus Alloxan

Modern syntheses generally do not begin with the free acid, but instead oxidize diethyl malonate. This line of syntheses was initiated by Louis Bouveault et al, who nitrosated the malonate with methyl nitrite before further oxidation with dinitrogen tetroxide N_{2}O_{4}:

Synthese von Diethyl oxomalonate über Isonitrosoester

In fact the methyl nitrite is not needed, and reaction of diethyl malonate with dinitrogen tetroxide alone already gives diethyl oxomalonate in 90% crude yield.

The best known syntheses are virtually quantitative: the enamine (EtO_{2}C)_{2}C=CHNMe_{2} (from a formamide acetal and the malonate ester) photooxygenates in virtually quantitative yield to diethyl oxomalonate hydrate and dimethylformamide. Aqueous sodium chlorite (NaClO_{2}) solution at pH 4.4 oxidizes diethyl malonate to the same product in 97% yield:

Synthese von Diethyl oxomalonate aus Malonester

Other oxidants are possible, but generally give lower yields; thusly dinitrogen trioxide (74–76%), selenium dioxide (23%), or ozone (62% or 76%, depending on the ozonolysis substrate):

Synthese von Diethyl oxomalonate aus Benzalmalonat

A bromination-hydrolysis sequence gives only 41–47%, and electrochemical oxidation of diethyl cyanomalonate gives 77% yield.

== Properties ==
Diethyl oxomalonate is a greenish-yellow, low-viscosity, low-odor oil that rapidly forms the dihydrate and crystallizes with water in shape of white prisms. The refractive index is 1.425 (20 °C, 589 nm) to 1.4310 (22 °C, 589 nm). The hydrate can be dehydrated through azeotropic distillation with toluene.

== Applications ==
The ketone in diethyl malonate is highly activated towards addition reactions. Heat is sufficient for an ene addition...

...and the Baylis-Hillman reaction (catalyzed by DABCO) completes in reasonable time:

Additions, especially aldol additions, tend to cascade into a transacylative cyclization. Thus Stork condensation with 3-pentanone gives a butenolide via an intermediate malic acid derivative...

Synthese eines substituierten Butenolids mit Diethylmesoxalat

...guanidines react to a functionalized imidazolone...

...and a bifunctional Grignard gives an isobenzofuran:

In Diels-Alder reactions, the mesoxalate acts as an electron-poor dienophile, ersatz carbon dioxide. The immediate [4+2] product with electron-rich 1,3-dienes (i.e., isoprenes or dimethylbutadienes) is a geminal dihydropyran diester, and further transformation converts the compound to a dihydropyranone:

Diels-Alder-Reaktion mit Diethylmesoxalat
