= Lactic acid/citric acid/potassium bitartrate =

Birth control medication

Combination of
- Lactic acid: Alpha hydroxy acid
- Citric acid: Tricarboxylic acid
- Potassium bitartrate: Sugar acid salt

Clinical data
- Trade names: Phexxi
- AHFS/Drugs.com: Multum Consumer Information
- License data: US DailyMed: Phexxi
- Routes of administration: Intravaginal
- ATC code: None

Legal status
- Legal status: US: ℞-only

Identifiers
- KEGG: D12498

Lactic acid/citric acid/potassium bitartrate, sold under the brand name Phexxi, is a non-hormonal combination medication used as a method of birth control. It contains lactic acid, citric acid, and potassium bitartrate. It is a gel inserted into the vagina.

The most common adverse reactions include vulvovaginal burning sensation, vulvovaginal pruritus, vulvovaginal mycotic infection, urinary tract infection, vulvovaginal discomfort, bacterial vaginosis, vaginal discharge, genital discomfort, dysuria, and vulvovaginal pain.

== Medical uses ==
The combination is indicated for the prevention of pregnancy in females of reproductive potential for use as an on-demand method of contraception.

== History ==
The combination was approved for medical use in the United States in May 2020.
