= Ammonium tartrate =

Names
- IUPAC name diazanium;(2R,3R)-2,3-dihydroxybutanedioate
- Other names L-(+)-Tartaric acid diammonium salt, Diammonium tartrate

Identifiers
CAS Number	3164-29-2
3D model (JSmol)	Interactive image
ChemSpider	17459
ECHA InfoCard	100.019.654
EC Number	221-618-9
PubChem CID	2724224
UNII	JI8UD88354
CompTox Dashboard (EPA)	DTXSID50889463
- InChI: InChI=1S/C4H6O6.2H3N/c5-1(3(7)8)2(6)4(9)10;;/h1-2,5-6H,(H,7,8)(H,9,10);2*1H3/t1-,2-;;/m1../s1 Key: NGPGDYLVALNKEG-OLXYHTOASA-N
- SMILES: C(C(C(=O)O)O)(C(=O)O)O.N.N

Properties
Chemical formula	C_{4}H_{12}N_{2}O_{6}
Molar mass	184.148 g·mol^{−1}
Appearance	colorless crystals
Density	1.601 g/cm^{3}
Boiling point	399.3 °C
Solubility in water	soluble

Hazards
Flash point	249.7 °C
- Except where otherwise noted, data are given for materials in their standard state (at 25 °C [77 °F], 100 kPa). Infobox references

Ammonium tartrate is a chemical compound with the chemical formula (NH_{4})_{2}C_{4}H_{4}O_{6}. This is an organic ammonium salt of tartaric acid.

== Synthesis ==
Ammonium tartrate can be prepared by the reaction of tartaric acid and ammonium carbonate.

== Physical properties ==
Ammonium tartrate forms colorless crystals that slowly release ammonia if exposed to air. Easily soluble in water, also soluble in alcohol.

Ammonium tartrate crystallizes in the monoclinic crystal system with the space group P21 (space group No. 4) with the lattice parameters a = 708 pm, b = 612 pm, c = 880 pm, β = 92.42 ° and Z = 2.

== Uses ==
The compound is used in textile industry and in medicine.

Also can be used as an analytical reagent and an intermediate in organic synthesis.

== See also ==
- Sodium ammonium tartrate
