= Potassium bitartrate =

Chemical salt used in cooking as cream of tartar

- Potassium bitartrate

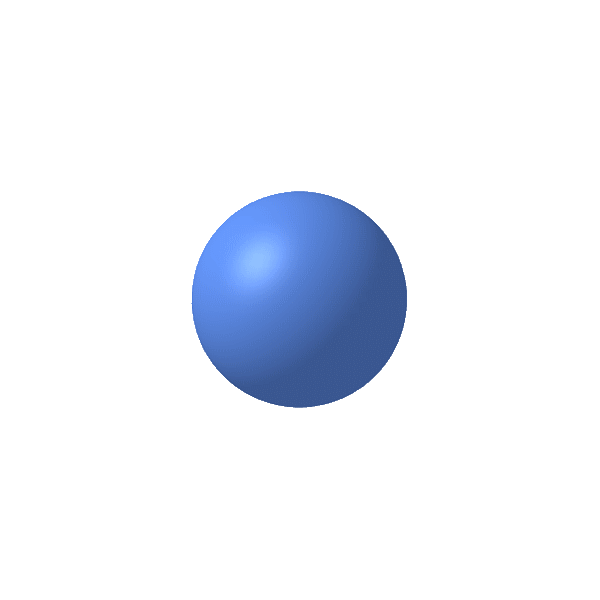

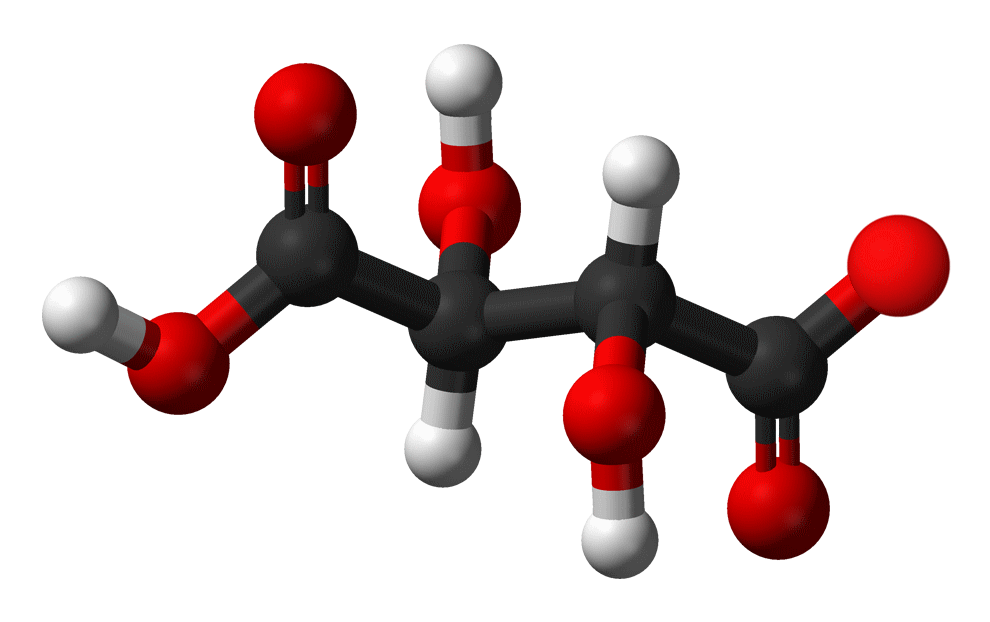

Names
- Preferred IUPAC name: Potassium (2R,3R)-2,3,4-trihydroxy-4-oxobutanoate
- Other names: Potassium hydrogen tartrate; Cream of tartar; Potassium acid tartrate; Monopotassium tartrate; Beeswing

Identifiers
CAS Number	868-14-4
3D model (JSmol)	Interactive image
ChemSpider	12783
ECHA InfoCard	100.011.609
E number	E336 (antioxidants, ...)
PubChem CID	23666342
UNII	NPT6P8P3UU
- InChI: InChI=1S/C4H6O6.K/c5-1(3(7)8)2(6)4(9)10;/h1-2,5-6H,(H,7,8)(H,9,10);/q;+1/p-1/t1-,2-;/m1./s1 Key: KYKNRZGSIGMXFH-ZVGUSBNCSA-M; InChI=1/C4H6O6.K/c5-1(3(7)8)2(6)4(9)10;/h1-2,5-6H,(H,7,8)(H,9,10);/q;+1/p-1/t1-,2-;/m1./s1 Key: KYKNRZGSIGMXFH-APGVQJISBP
- SMILES: [C@@H]([C@H](C(=O)[O-])O)(C(=O)O)O.[K+]

Properties
Chemical formula	KC_{4}H_{5}O_{6}
Molar mass	188.177
Appearance	White crystalline powder
Density	1.05 g/cm^{3} (solid)
Solubility in water	0.57 g/100 ml (20 °C); 6.1 g/100 ml (100 °C)
Solubility	Soluble in acid, alkali Insoluble in acetic acid, alcohol
Refractive index (n_{D})	1.511

Pharmacology
ATC code	A12BA03 (WHO)

Hazards
- Lethal dose or concentration (LD, LC)
LD_{50} (median dose)	22 g/kg (oral, rat)
- Except where otherwise noted, data are given for materials in their standard state (at 25 °C [77 °F], 100 kPa). verify (what is ?) Infobox references

Potassium bitartrate, also known as potassium hydrogen tartrate, with formula KC_{4}H_{5}O_{6}, is the potassium acid salt of tartaric acid (a carboxylic acid)—specifically, l-( + )-tartaric acid. Especially in cooking, it is also known as cream of tartar. Tartaric acid and potassium naturally occur in grapes; its crude precipitate form, tartar or wine stone, is a byproduct of winemaking found deposited on top of must barrels, which can be purified.

Cream of tartar is used as an additive, stabilizer, pH control agent, antimicrobial agent, processing aid, and thickener in various food products. It is used as a component of baking powders and baking mixes, and is valued for its use in stabilizing egg whites, which enhances the volume and texture of meringues and soufflés. Its acidic properties prevent sugar syrups from crystallizing, aiding in the production of smooth confections such as candies and frostings. When combined with sodium bicarbonate, it acts as a leavening agent, producing carbon dioxide gas that helps baked goods rise. It will also stabilize whipped cream, allowing it to retain its shape for longer periods.

Potassium bitartrate further serves as mordant in textile dyeing, as a reducer of chromium trioxide in mordants for wool, as a metal processing agent that prevents oxidation, as an intermediate for other potassium tartrates, as a cleaning agent when mixed with a weak acid such as vinegar, and as reference standard pH buffer. It has a long history of medical and veterinary use as a laxative administered as a rectal suppository, and is used also as a cathartic and as a diuretic. It is an approved third-class OTC drug in Japan and is one of the active ingredients in Phexxi , a non-hormonal contraceptive agent that was approved by the FDA in May 2020.

== History ==
Potassium bitartrate was first characterized by Swedish chemist Carl Wilhelm Scheele (1742–1786). This was a result of Scheele's work studying fluorite and hydrofluoric acid.

Scheele may have been the first scientist to publish work on potassium bitartrate, but use of potassium bitartrate has been reported to date back 7000 years to an ancient village in northern Iran. Modern applications of cream of tartar started in 1768 after it gained popularity when the French started using it regularly in their cuisine.

In 2021, a connection between potassium bitartrate and canine and feline toxicity of grapes was first proposed. Since then, it has been deemed likely as the source of grape and raisin toxicity to pets.

== Occurrence ==
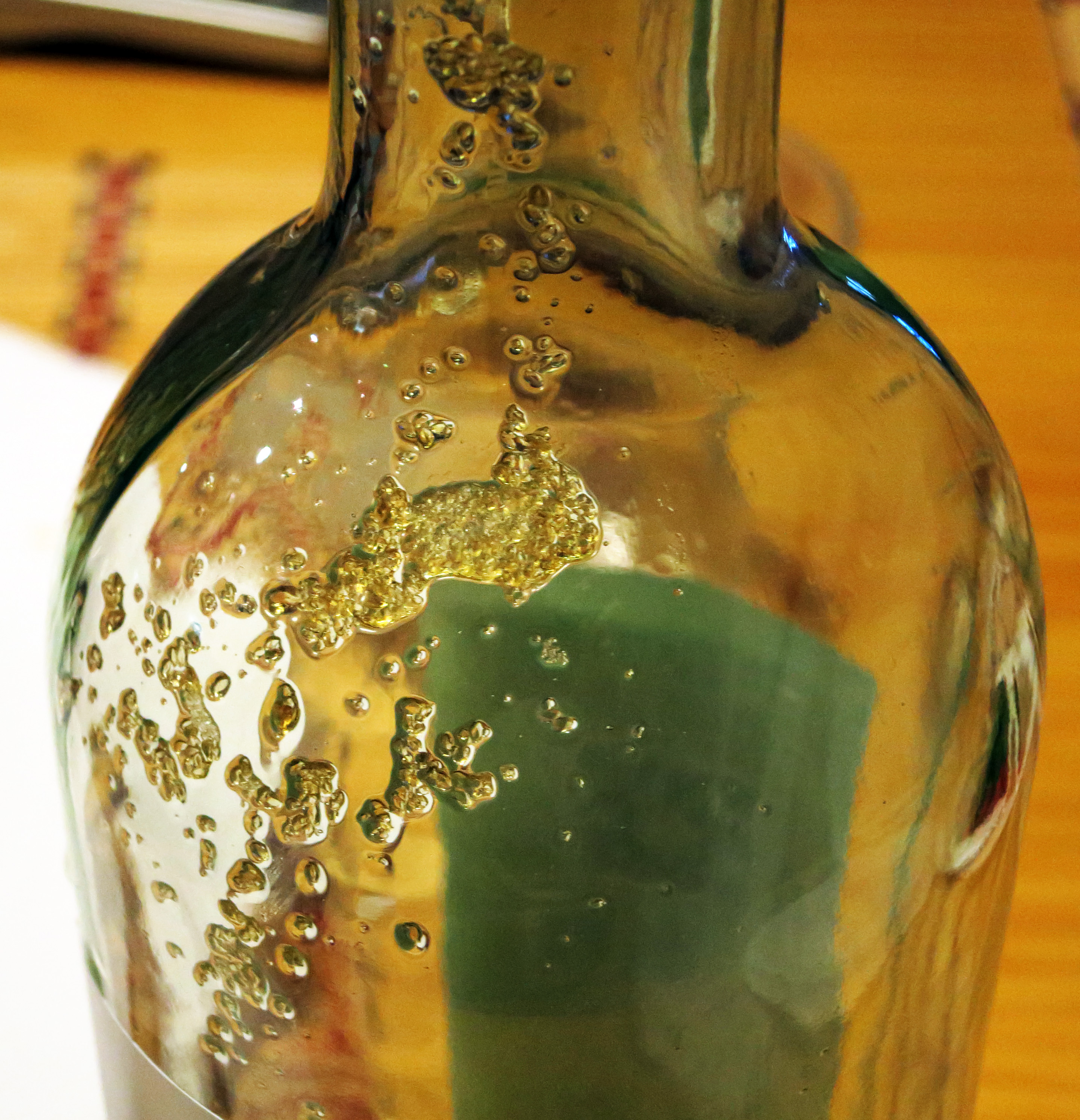
Potassium bitartrate in an empty white wine bottle

Potassium bitartrate is naturally formed in grapes from the acid dissociation of tartaric acid into bitartrate and tartrate ions.

Potassium bitartrate has a low solubility in water. It crystallizes in wine casks during the fermentation of grape juice, and can precipitate out of wine in bottles. The rate of potassium bitartrate precipitation depends on the rates of nuclei formation and crystal growth, which varies based on a wine's alcohol, sugar, and extract content. The crystals (wine diamonds) will often form on the underside of a cork in wine-filled bottles that have been stored at temperatures below 10 °C (50 °F), and will seldom, if ever, dissolve naturally into the wine. Over time, crystal formation is less likely to occur due to the decreasing supersaturation of potassium bitartrate, with the greatest amount of precipitation occurring in the initial few days of cooling.

Historically, it was known as beeswing for its resemblance to the sheen of bees' wings. It was collected and purified to produce the white, odorless, acidic powder used for many culinary and other household purposes.

These crystals also precipitate out of fresh grape juice that has been chilled or allowed to stand for some time. To prevent crystals from forming in homemade grape jam or jelly, the prerequisite fresh grape juice should be chilled overnight to promote crystallization. The potassium bitartrate crystals are removed by filtering through two layers of cheesecloth. The filtered juice may then be made into jam or jelly. In some cases they adhere to the side of the chilled container, making filtering unnecessary.

The presence of crystals is less prevalent in red wines than in white wines. This is because red wines have a higher amount of tannin and colouring matter present as well as a higher sugar and extract content than white wines. Various methods such as promoting crystallization and filtering, removing the active species required for potassium bitartrate precipitation, and adding additives have been implemented to reduce the presence of potassium bitartrate crystals in wine.

== Applications ==
=== In food ===
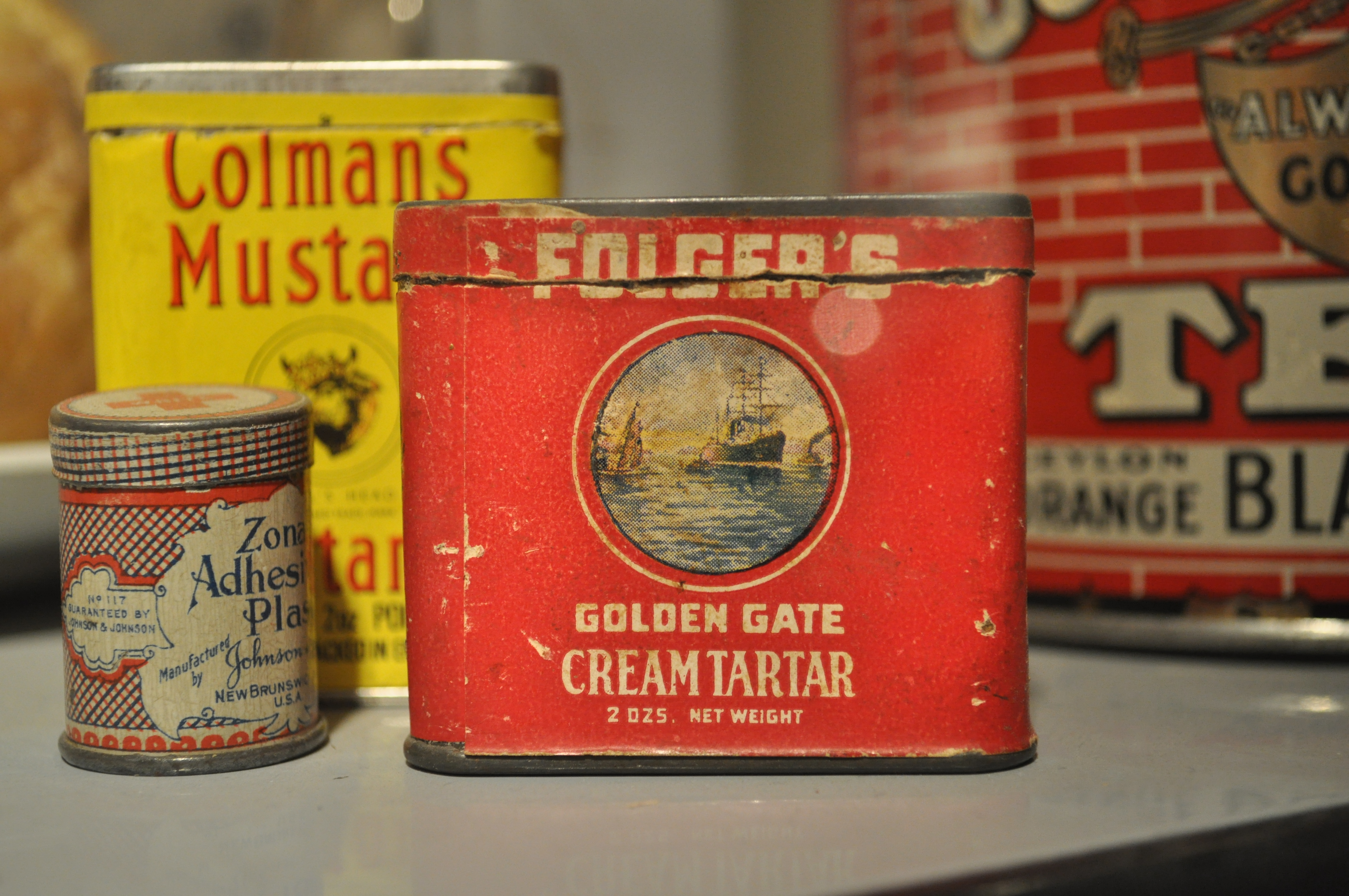
Folger's Golden Gate Cream Tartar, first half of 20th century

In food, potassium bitartrate is used for:

- Stabilizing egg whites, increasing their warmth-tolerance and volume
- Stabilizing whipped cream, maintaining its texture and volume
- Anti-caking and thickening
- Preventing sugar syrups from crystallizing by causing some of the sucrose to break down into glucose and fructose
- Reducing discoloration of boiled vegetables

Additionally, it is used as a component of:

- Baking powder, as an acid ingredient to activate baking soda
- Salt substitutes, in combination with potassium chloride

A similar acid salt, sodium acid pyrophosphate, can be confused with cream of tartar because of its common function as a component of baking powder.

=== Baking ===
Adding cream of tartar to egg whites gives volume to cakes, and makes them more tender. As cream of tartar is added, the pH decreases to around the isoelectric point of the foaming proteins in egg whites. Foaming properties of egg whites are optimal at this pH due to increased protein-protein interactions. The low pH also results in a whiter crumb in cakes due to flour pigments that respond to these pH changes. However, adding too much cream of tartar (>2.4% weight of egg white) can affect the texture and taste of cakes. The optimal cream of tartar concentration to increase volume and the whiteness of interior crumbs without making the cake too tender, is about 1/4 tsp per egg white.

As an acid, cream of tartar with heat reduces sugar crystallization in invert syrups by helping to break down sucrose into its monomer components – fructose and glucose in equal parts. Preventing the formation of sugar crystals makes the syrup have a non-grainy texture, shinier and less prone to break and dry. However, a downside of relying on cream of tartar to thin out crystalline sugar confections (like fudge) is that it can be hard to add the right amount of acid to get the desired consistency.

Cream of tartar is used as a type of acid salt that is crucial in baking powder. Upon dissolving in batter or dough, the tartaric acid that is released reacts with baking soda to form carbon dioxide that is used for leavening. Since cream of tartar is fast-acting, it releases over 70 percent of carbon dioxide gas during mixing.

=== Household use ===
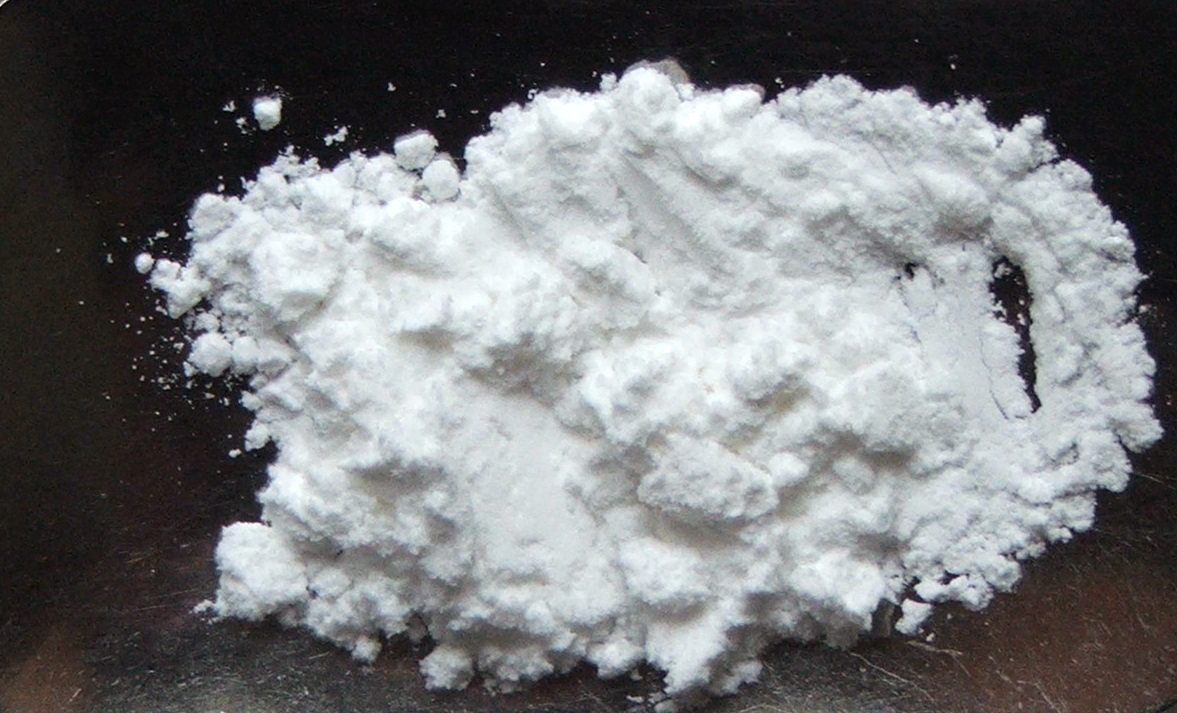
Potassium bitartrate powder

Potassium bitartrate can be mixed with an acidic liquid, such as lemon juice or white vinegar, to make a paste-like cleaning agent for metals, such as brass, aluminium, or copper, or with water for other cleaning applications, such as removing light stains from porcelain. This mixture is sometimes mistakenly made with vinegar and sodium bicarbonate (baking soda), which actually react to neutralize each other, creating carbon dioxide and a sodium acetate solution.

Cream of tartar was often used in traditional dyeing where the complexing action of the tartrate ions was used to adjust the solubility and hydrolysis of mordant salts such as tin chloride and alum.

Cream of tartar, when mixed into a paste with hydrogen peroxide, can be used to clean rust from some hand tools, notably hand files. The paste is applied, left to set for a few hours, and then washed off with a baking soda/water solution. After another rinse with water and thorough drying, a thin application of oil will protect the file from further rusting.

Slowing the set time of plaster of Paris products (most widely used in gypsum plaster wall work and artwork casting) is typically achieved by the simple introduction of almost any acid diluted into the mixing water. A commercial retardant premix additive sold by USG to trade interior plasterers includes at least 40% potassium bitartrate. The remaining ingredients are the same plaster of Paris and quartz-silica aggregate already prominent in the main product. This means that the only active ingredient is the cream of tartar.

=== Cosmetics ===
For dyeing hair, potassium bitartrate can be mixed with henna as the mild acid needed to activate the henna.

=== Textiles ===
Cream of tartar is often used in traditional dyeing processes, where its complexing action helps fix mordant salts like tin chloride and alum to fabric. It is especially useful in brightening cochineal dye.

=== Medicinal use ===
Cream of tartar has been used internally as a purgative, but this is dangerous because an excess of potassium, or hyperkalemia, may occur.

Potassium bitartrate is also used as a laxative. The carbon dioxide it releases causes mechanical distension against the intestinal wall, inducing bowel movements. Combined with sodium bicarbonate in a poly(ethylene glycol)-based suppository, it is a useful and safe treatment for patients at risk of electrolyte, renal, or cardiovascular disorders. It is a third-class over-the-counter drug in Japan.

=== Chemistry ===
Potassium bitartrate is the United States' National Institute of Standards and Technology's primary reference standard for a pH buffer. Using an excess of the salt in water, a saturated solution is created with a pH of 3.557 at 25 °C (77 °F). Upon dissolution in water, potassium bitartrate will dissociate into acid tartrate, tartrate, and potassium ions. Thus, a saturated solution creates a buffer with standard pH. Before use as a standard, it is recommended that the solution be filtered or decanted between 22 °C (72 °F) and 28 °C (82 °F).

Potassium carbonate can be made by burning cream of tartar, which produces "potash" This process is now obsolete but produced a higher quality (reasonable purity) than "potash" extracted from wood or other plant ashes.

== Production ==
Potassium bitartrate is often produced as a by-product of winemaking. Lees (sediment) are collected following the fermentation process and dissolved in hot water, filtered, and cooled. Occasionally, excess tartaric acid is added to the lees to increase the saturation of potassium bitartrate in solution. Since the solubility of potassium bitartrate is highly dependent on temperature, the pure salt begins to crystallise out of solution, and can be collected via filtering once again. This solubility can also be exploited to produce potassium from Seignette's Salt (also known as Rochelle's Salt or potassium sodium tartrate). Acidification to pH 3.5 with small amounts of hydrochloric acid will precipitate potassium bitartrate.

== See also ==
- Tartrate
- Tartaric acid
- Potassium tartrate (K_{2}C_{4}H_{4}O_{6})
- Potassium bicarbonate
