= Sodium ammonium tartrate =

Names
- IUPAC name 2,3-Dihydroxybutanedioic acid, monoammonium monosodium salt
- Other names Ammonium Rochelle salt

Identifiers
CAS Number	(L): 16828-01-6
3D model (JSmol)	(D/L): Interactive image
ChemSpider	(D/L): 10667488
ECHA InfoCard	100.037.121
EC Number	(L): 240-850-1
PubChem CID	(D/L): 21915779
CompTox Dashboard (EPA)	DTXSID90937472
- InChI: (D/L): InChI=1S/C4H6O6.H3N.Na/c5-1(3(7)8)2(6)4(9)10;;/h1-2,5-6H,(H,7,8)(H,9,10);1H3;/q;;+1/p-1 Key: QGKIJYBOYMJGHT-UHFFFAOYSA-M
- SMILES: (D/L): C(C(C(=O)[O-])O)(C(=O)[O-])O.[NH4+].[Na+]

Properties
Chemical formula	C_{4}H_{8}NNaO_{6}
Molar mass	189.099 g·mol^{−1}
Appearance	White solid
- Except where otherwise noted, data are given for materials in their standard state (at 25 °C [77 °F], 100 kPa). Infobox references

Sodium ammonium tartrate (NAT) is an organic compound with the formula Na(NH_{4})[O_{2}CCH(OH)CH(OH)CO_{2}]. The salt is derived from tartaric acid by neutralizing with ammonia and with sodium hydroxide. Louis Pasteur obtained enantiopure crystals of the tetrahydrate of NAT, via the process of spontaneous resolution. His discovery led to increased study of optical activity, which eventually was shown to have broad implications. Many modifications of this salt have been investigated by X-ray crystallography, including the racemate, which crystallizes as the monohydrate.

== Related compounds ==
- Ammonium tartrate
- Rochelle salt (NaKO_{2}CCH(OH)CH(OH)CO_{2}(H_{2}O)_{4}), the first ferroelectric material discovered
