= Potassium tartrate =

Names
- IUPAC name Dipotassium 2,3-dihydroxybutanedioate
- Other names Dipotassium tartrate; Argol; E336

Identifiers
CAS Number	921-53-9 (L)
3D model (JSmol)	Interactive image
ChemSpider	2697916
ECHA InfoCard	100.005.180
PubChem CID	8984
UNII	O9WLL1ZL8S (L)
- InChI: InChI=1S/C4H6O6.2K/c5-1(3(7)8)2(6)4(9)10;;/h1-2,5-6H,(H,7,8)(H,9,10);;/q;2*+1/p-2 Key: AVTYONGGKAJVTE-UHFFFAOYSA-L; InChI=1/C4H6O6.2K/c5-1(3(7)8)2(6)4(9)10;;/h1-2,5-6H,(H,7,8)(H,9,10);;/q;2*+1/p-2 Key: AVTYONGGKAJVTE-NUQVWONBAX
- SMILES: C(C(C(=O)[O-])O)(C(=O)[O-])O.[K+].[K+]

Properties
Chemical formula	C_{4}H_{4}K_{2}O_{6}
Molar mass	226.268 g/mol
Appearance	colorless, slightly opaque crystals
Density	1.984 g/cm^{3}
Solubility	insoluble in alcohol
Refractive index (n_{D})	1.550

Structure
Crystal structure	monoclinic
- Except where otherwise noted, data are given for materials in their standard state (at 25 °C [77 °F], 100 kPa). verify (what is ?) Infobox references

Potassium tartrate, dipotassium tartrate or argol has formula K_{2}C_{4}H_{4}O_{6}. It is the potassium salt of tartaric acid. It is often confused with potassium bitartrate, also known as cream of tartar. As a food additive, it shares the E number E336 with potassium bitartrate.

== Manufacturing ==
Potassium tartrate is produced by the reaction of tartaric acid with potassium sodium tartrate (rochelle salt), and potassium sulfate, followed by filtration, purification, precipitation and drying.

== Other compounds ==
Tartar emetic is produced when potassium tartrate is heated with antimony trioxide. Tartar emetic causes intense nausea, prostration and vomiting by irritating the gastrointestinal mucosa.https://go.drugbank.com/drugs/DB11107
