= Tartronic acid =

Names
- Preferred IUPAC name Hydroxypropanedioic acid
- Systematic IUPAC name 2-hydroxypropandioic acid
- Other names tartronic acid, 2-tartronic acid, hydroxymalonic acid, 2-hydroxymalonic acid

Identifiers
CAS Number	80-69-3
3D model (JSmol)	Interactive image
ChEBI	CHEBI:16513
ChemSpider	44
ECHA InfoCard	100.001.184
EC Number	201-301-1
KEGG	C02287
PubChem CID	45
UNII	34T0025E0L
CompTox Dashboard (EPA)	DTXSID6075358
- InChI: InChI=1S/C3H4O5/c4-1(2(5)6)3(7)8/h1,4H,(H,5,6)(H,7,8) Key: ROBFUDYVXSDBQM-UHFFFAOYSA-N; InChI=1/C3H4O5/c4-1(2(5)6)3 (7)8/h1,4H,(H,5,6)(H,7,8); InChI=1/C3H4O5/c4-1(2(5)6)3(7)8/h1,4H,(H,5,6)(H,7,8) Key: ROBFUDYVXSDBQM-UHFFFAOYAD
- SMILES: O=C(O)C(O)C(=O)O

Properties
Chemical formula	C_{3}H_{4}O_{5}
Molar mass	120.060 g·mol^{−1}
Appearance	white solid
Density	1.849 g/cm^{3}
Melting point	159 °C (318 °F; 432 K) (decomposes)

Hazards
NFPA 704 (fire diamond)	2 0 0

Related compounds
Related carboxylic acids	Tartaric acid Malic acid Mesoxalic acid Lactic acid 3-Hydroxypropionic acid Malonic acid Propionic acid Oxalic acid
Related compounds	Glyceric acid Glyceraldehyde; Tartonaldehyde; Glycerol
- Except where otherwise noted, data are given for materials in their standard state (at 25 °C [77 °F], 100 kPa). verify (what is ?) Infobox references

Tartronic acid or 2-hydroxymalonic acid is an organic compound with the structural formula of HOCH(CO_{2}H)_{2}. This dicarboxylic acid is related to malonic acid. It is a white solid. It is produced by oxidation of glycerol:

HOCH_{2}CH(OH)CH_{2}OH + 2 O_{2} → HO_{2}CCH(OH)CO_{2}H + 2 H_{2}O

Glyceric acid HOCH_{2}CH(OH)CO_{2}H is an intermediate.

Its derivative, 2-methyltartronic acid, is isomalic acid.

== Uses ==
Oxidation of tartronic acid gives the ketone mesoxalic acid, the simplest oxodicarboxylic acid.
