= Sodium tartrate =

Sodium l-tartrate

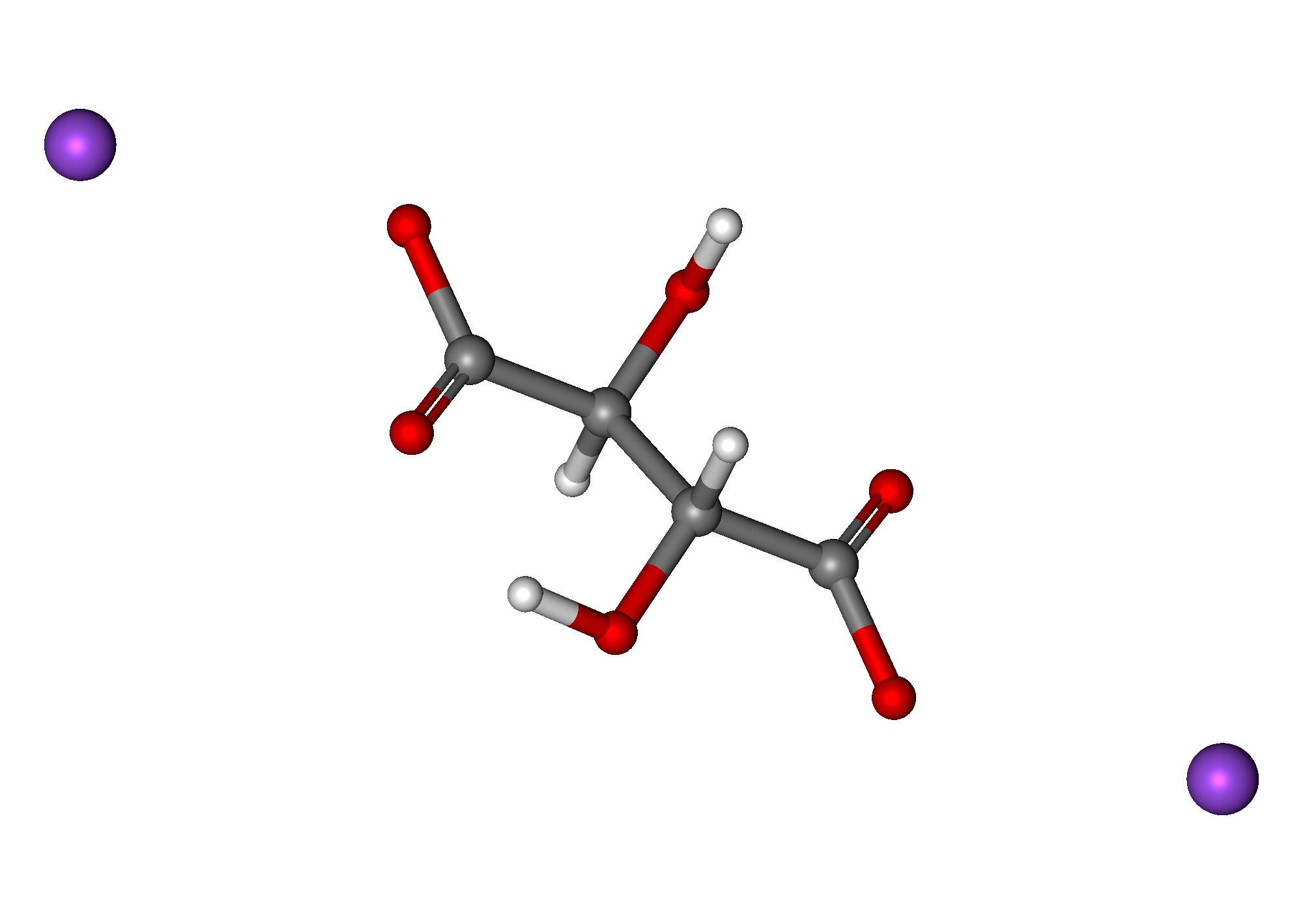

Names
- IUPAC name disodium (2R,3R)-2,3-dihydroxybutanedioate
- Other names Sal tartar; Disodium tartrate; Bisodium tartrate; Sodium l-(+)-tartrate; E335

Identifiers
CAS Number	868-18-8 (anhydrous); 6106-24-7 (dihydrate)
3D model (JSmol)	Interactive image
ChemSpider	12786
PubChem CID	13355
UNII	QTO9JB4MDD; DIA7C37AOW (dihydrate)
CompTox Dashboard (EPA)	DTXSID1028021
- InChI: InChI=1S/C4H6O6.2Na/c5-1(3(7)8)2(6)4(9)10;;/h1-2,5-6H,(H,7,8)(H,9,10);;/q;2*+1/p-2 Key: HELHAJAZNSDZJO-UHFFFAOYSA-L; InChI=1S/C4H6O6.2Na/c5-1(3(7)8)2(6)4(9)10;;/h1-2,5-6H,(H,7,8)(H,9,10);;/q;2*+1/p-2 Key: HELHAJAZNSDZJO-NUQVWONBAO; Key: HELHAJAZNSDZJO-UHFFFAOYSA-L
- SMILES: [Na+].[Na+].O=C([O-])C(O)C(O)C([O-])=O

Properties
Chemical formula	C_{4}H_{4}Na_{2}O_{6} (anhydrous); C_{4}H_{8}Na_{2}O_{8} (dihydrate)
Molar mass	194.051 g/mol (anhydrous); 230.082 g/mol (dihydrate)
Appearance	white crystals
Density	1.545 g/cm^{3} (dihydrate)
Solubility in water	soluble
Solubility	insoluble in ethanol

Pharmacology
ATC code	A06AD21 (WHO)
- Except where otherwise noted, data are given for materials in their standard state (at 25 °C [77 °F], 100 kPa). verify (what is ?) Infobox references

Sodium tartrate (Na_{2}C_{4}H_{4}O_{6}) is a salt used as an emulsifier and a binding agent in food products such as jellies, margarine, and sausage casings. As a food additive, it is known by the E number E335.

It is made by the combination reaction of baking soda/sodium bicarbonate (NaHCO_{3}) with tartaric acid.

Because its crystal structure captures a very precise amount of water, it is also a common primary standard for Karl Fischer titration, a common technique to assay water content.

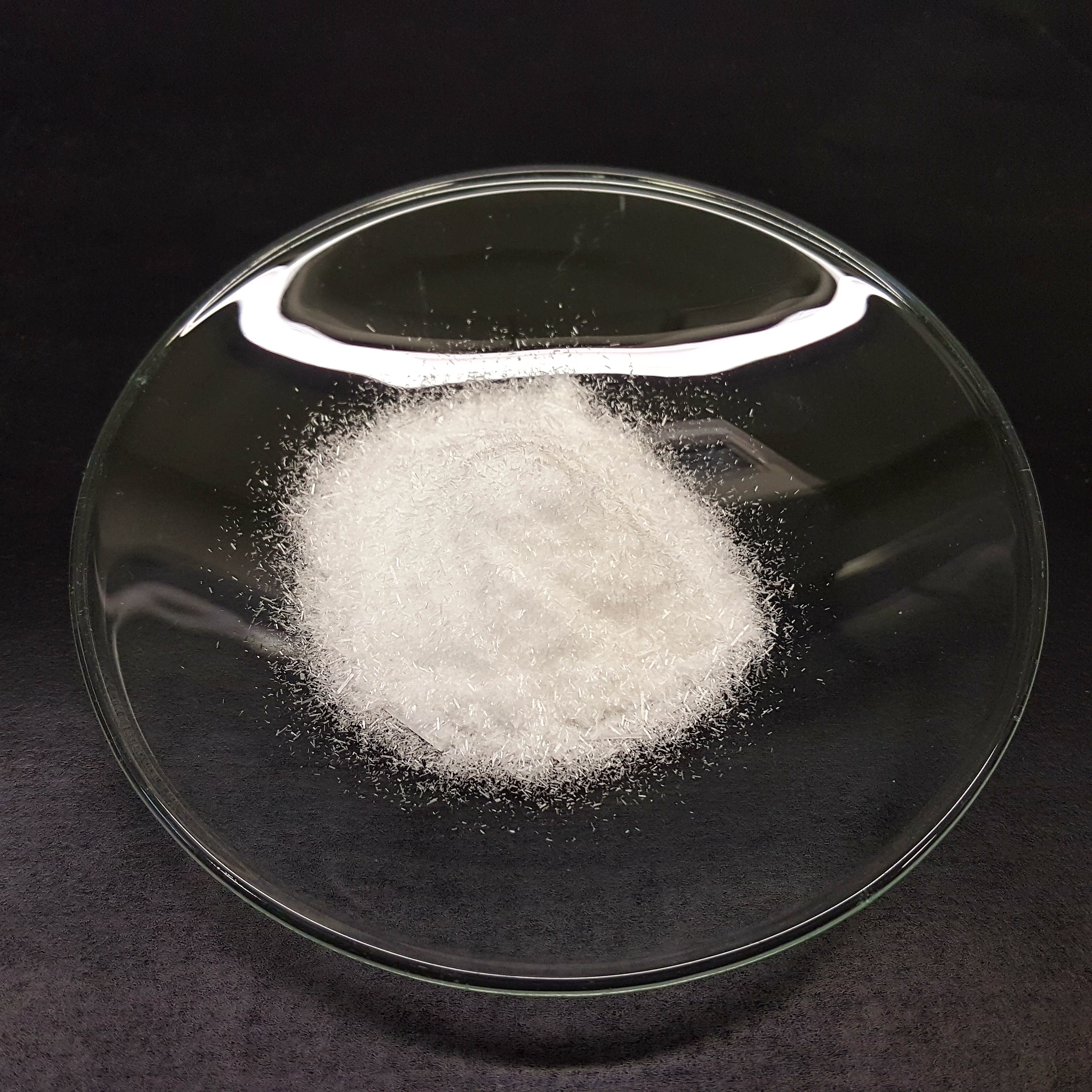
Di-sodium tartrate dihydrate

== See also ==
- Monosodium tartrate
