= Monosodium tartrate =

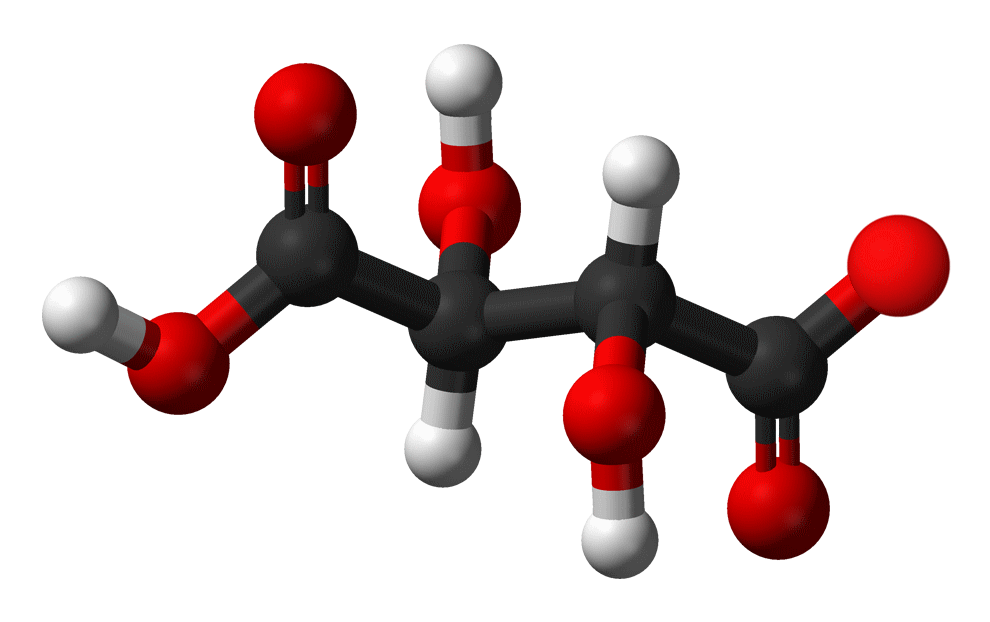

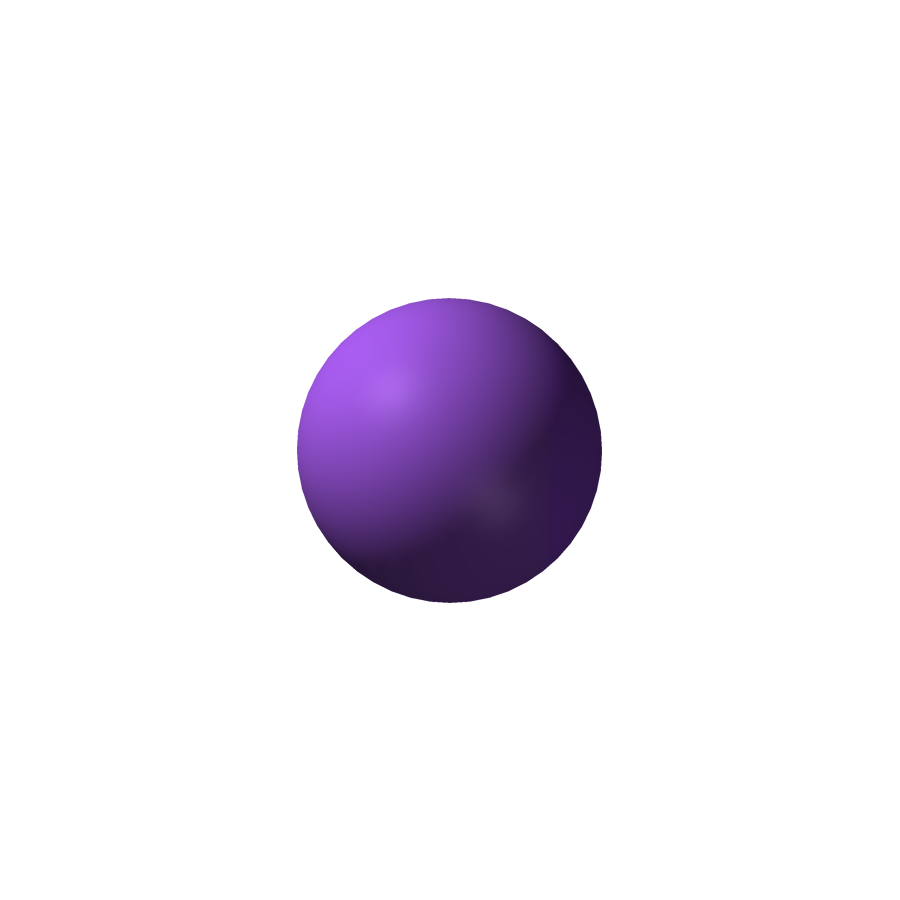

Names
- IUPAC name Sodium hydrogen tartrate
- Systematic IUPAC name Sodium 3-carboxy-2,3-dihydroxypropionate
- Other names Sodium bitartrate; E335

Identifiers
CAS Number	526-94-3
3D model (JSmol)	Interactive image
ChemSpider	10239
ECHA InfoCard	100.007.638
EC Number	238-470-6
PubChem CID	23690454
UNII	75E63I9H07
CompTox Dashboard (EPA)	DTXSID40948715 DTXSID70883423, DTXSID40948715
- InChI: InChI=1S/C4H6O6.Na/c5-1(3(7)8)2(6)4(9)10;/h1-2,5-6H,(H,7,8)(H,9,10);/q;+1/p-1 Key: NKAAEMMYHLFEFN-UHFFFAOYSA-M; InChI=1/C4H6O6.Na/c5-1(3(7)8)2(6)4(9)10;/h1-2,5-6H,(H,7,8)(H,9,10);/q;+1/p-1 Key: NKAAEMMYHLFEFN-REWHXWOFAB
- SMILES: C(C(C(=O)[O-])O)(C(=O)O)O.[Na+]

Properties
Chemical formula	C_{4}H_{5}NaO_{6}
Molar mass	172.07 g/mol
- Except where otherwise noted, data are given for materials in their standard state (at 25 °C [77 °F], 100 kPa). verify (what is ?) Infobox references

Monosodium tartrate or sodium bitartrate is a sodium acid salt of tartaric acid. As a food additive it is used as an acidity regulator and is known by the E number E335. As an analytical reagent, it can be used in a test for ammonium cation which gives a white precipitate.

== See also ==
- Sodium tartrate, the disodium salt of tartaric acid
