= Calcium tartrate =

Names
- IUPAC name 2,3-Dihydroxybutanedioic acid calcium salt

Identifiers
CAS Number	3164-34-9 (anhydrous); 5892-21-7 (tetrahydrate)
3D model (JSmol)	Interactive image
ChemSpider	10606089
ECHA InfoCard	100.019.656
EC Number	221-621-5
E number	E354 (antioxidants, ...)
PubChem CID	13725892
UNII	O6I5B26XA7 (anhydrous)
CompTox Dashboard (EPA)	DTXSID50883961
- InChI: InChI=1S/C4H6O6.Ca/c5-1(3(7)8)2(6)4(9)10;/h1-2,5-6H,(H,7,8)(H,9,10);/q;+2/p-2 Key: GUPPESBEIQALOS-UHFFFAOYSA-L; InChI=1/C4H6O6.Ca/c5-1(3(7)8)2(6)4(9)10;/h1-2,5-6H,(H,7,8)(H,9,10);/q;+2/p-2 Key: GUPPESBEIQALOS-NUQVWONBAP
- SMILES: [Ca+2].O=C([O-])C(O)C(O)C([O-])=O

Properties
Chemical formula	CaC_{4}H_{4}O_{6}
Molar mass	190.16484 g/mol (anhydrous); 260.21 g/mol (tetrahydrate)
Appearance	hygroscopic white powder or colorless crystals
Density	1.817 g/cm^{3} (tetrahydrate)
Melting point	tetrahydrate decomposes at 160 °C anhydrous decomposes at 650 °C
Solubility in water	0.037 g/100 ml (0 °C) 0.2 g/100 ml (85 °C)

Structure
Crystal structure	d or l rhombic dl triclinic

Hazards
Safety data sheet (SDS)	Calcium tartrate
- Except where otherwise noted, data are given for materials in their standard state (at 25 °C [77 °F], 100 kPa). verify (what is ?) Infobox references

Calcium tartrate, exactly calcium L-tartrate, is a byproduct of the wine industry, prepared from wine fermentation dregs. It is the calcium salt of L-tartaric acid, an acid most commonly found in grapes. Its solubility decreases with lower temperature, which results in the forming of whitish (in red wine often reddish) crystalline clusters as it precipitates. As E number E354, it finds use as a food preservative and acidity regulator. Like tartaric acid, calcium tartrate has two asymmetric carbons, hence it has two chiral isomers and a non-chiral isomer (meso-form). Most calcium tartrate of biological origin is the chiral levorotatory (–) isomer.
