= Glyceric acid =

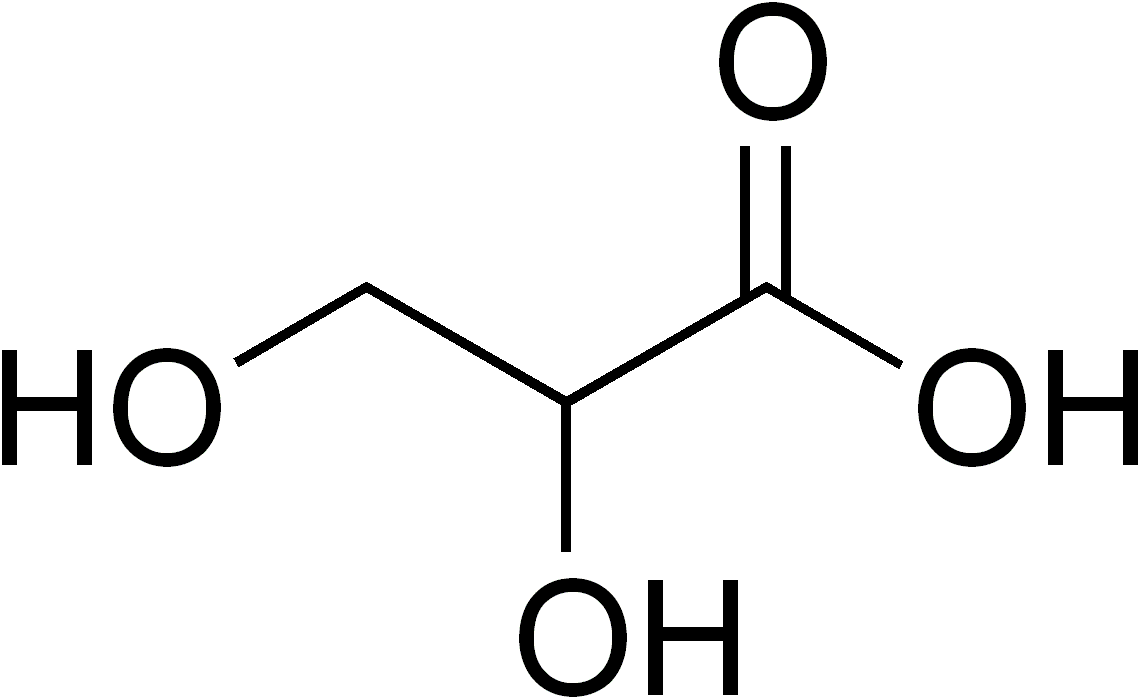

Names
- Preferred IUPAC name 2,3-Dihydroxypropanoic acid
- Other names Glyceric acid

Identifiers
CAS Number	473-81-4 racemate; 6000-40-4 D-glyceric acid (R-enantiomer); 28305-26-2 L-glyceric acid (S-enantiomer)
3D model (JSmol)	Interactive image
ChEBI	CHEBI:33508
ChemSpider	732
ECHA InfoCard	100.006.795
PubChem CID	752
UNII	70KH64UX7G
CompTox Dashboard (EPA)	DTXSID80861979, DTXSID701016564 DTXSID30963795, DTXSID80861979, DTXSID701016564
- InChI: InChI=1S/C3H6O4/c4-1-2(5)3(6)7/h2,4-5H,1H2,(H,6,7) Key: RBNPOMFGQQGHHO-UHFFFAOYSA-N; InChI=1/C3H6O4/c4-1-2(5)3(6)7/h2,4-5H,1H2,(H,6,7) Key: RBNPOMFGQQGHHO-UHFFFAOYAE
- SMILES: C(C(C(=O)O)O)O

Properties
Chemical formula	C_{3}H_{6}O_{4}
Molar mass	106.077 g·mol^{−1}
Appearance	colorless syrup
Melting point	<25 °C
- Except where otherwise noted, data are given for materials in their standard state (at 25 °C [77 °F], 100 kPa). verify (what is ?) Infobox references

Glyceric acid refers to organic compounds with the formula HOCH_{2}CH(OH)CO_{2}H. It occurs naturally and is classified as three-carbon sugar acid. It is chiral. Salts and esters of glyceric acid are known as glycerates.

== Production ==
Glyceric acid is usually produced by oxidation of glycerol. A typical oxidant is nitric acid, but catalytic oxidations have been developed also:

HOCH_{2}CH(OH)CH_{2}OH + O_{2} → HOCH_{2}CH(OH)CO_{2}H + H_{2}O

As glycerol is prochiral, the oxidation of the two terminal alcohol groups gives distinct enantiomers of glyceric acid. Oxidation of both primary alcohols gives tartronic acid:

HOCH_{2}CH(OH)CH_{2}OH + 2 O_{2} → HO_{2}CCH(OH)CO_{2}H + 2 H_{2}O

== Biochemistry ==
Several phosphate derivatives of glyceric acid, including 2-phosphoglyceric acid, 3-phosphoglyceric acid, 2,3-bisphosphoglyceric acid, and 1,3-bisphosphoglyceric acid, are intermediates in glycolysis. 3-Phosphoglyceric acid is an intermediate in the biosynthesis of the amino acid serine, which in turn can be used in the synthesis of glycine and cysteine.

Glyceric acid occurs naturally in Populus tremula and Ardisia crenata.
