= Tartaric acid =

Organic acid found in many fruits

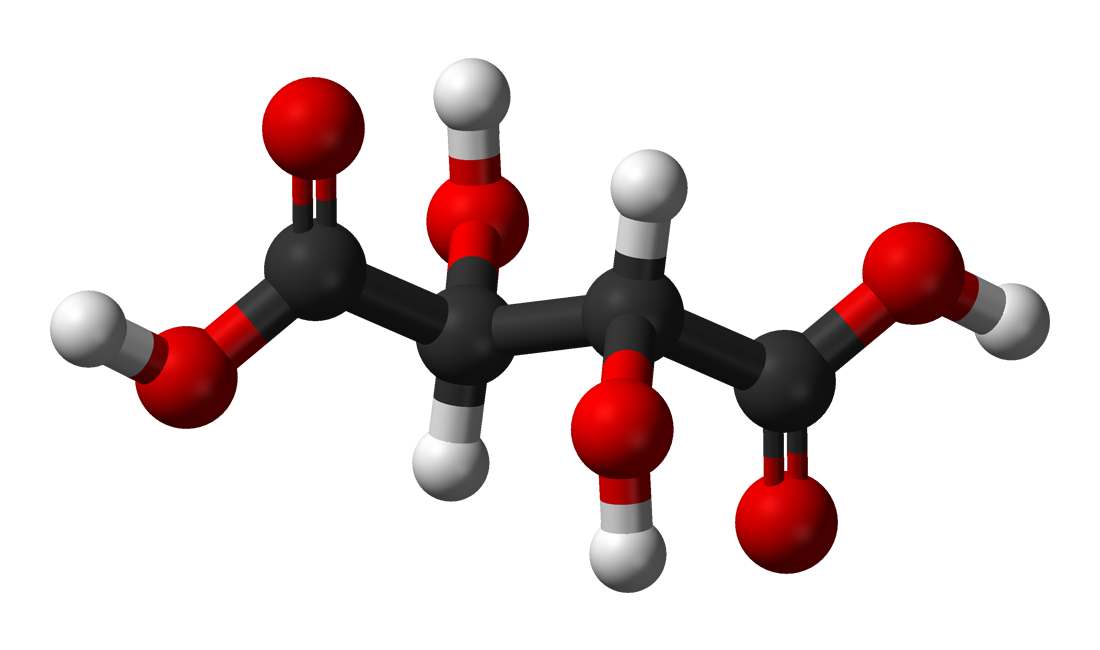
- Ball-and-stick model of meso-tartaric acid

- Jar of inch-scale tartaric acid crystals

Names
- IUPAC name Tartaric acid
- Preferred IUPAC name 2,3-Dihydroxybutanedioic acid
- Systematic IUPAC name (2R, 3R)-Threaric acid (+) (2S, 3S)-Threaric acid (-) meso-Erythraric acid
- Other names Tartaric acid 2,3-Dihydroxysuccinic acid Threaric acid Racemic acid Uvic acid Paratartaric acid Winestone

Identifiers
CAS Number	R,R-isomer: 87-69-4; S,S-isomer: 147-71-7; racemic: 133-37-9; meso-isomer: 147-73-9
3D model (JSmol)	Interactive image
ChEBI	CHEBI:15674
ChEMBL	ChEMBL333714; ChEMBL1200861
ChemSpider	852
DrugBank	DB01694
ECHA InfoCard	100.121.903
E number	E334 (antioxidants, ...)
KEGG	C00898
MeSH	tartaric+acid
PubChem CID	875 unspecified isomer
UNII	W4888I119H
CompTox Dashboard (EPA)	DTXSID501031477 DTXSID5046986, DTXSID501031477
- InChI: InChI=1S/C4H6O6/c5-1(3(7)8)2(6)4(9)10/h1-2,5-6H,(H,7,8)(H,9,10) Key: FEWJPZIEWOKRBE-UHFFFAOYSA-N; InChI=1/C4H6O6/c5-1(3(7)8)2(6)4(9)10/h1-2,5-6H,(H,7,8)(H,9,10) Key: FEWJPZIEWOKRBE-UHFFFAOYAZ
- SMILES: O=C(O)C(O)C(O)C(=O)O

Properties
Chemical formula	C_{4}H_{6}O_{6} (basic formula); HO_{2}CCH(OH)CH(OH)CO_{2}H (structural formula)
Molar mass	150.087 g/mol
Appearance	White powder
Density	1.737 g/cm^{3} (R,R- and S,S-); 1.79 g/cm^{3} (racemate); 1.886 g/cm^{3} (meso)
Melting point	169, 172 °C (R,R- and S,S-); 206 °C (racemate); 165-6 °C (meso)
Solubility in water	1.33 kg/L (L or D-tartaric); 0.21 kg/L (DL, racemic); 1.25 kg/L ("meso")
Acidity (pK_{a})	L(+) 25 °C : pK_{a1}= 2.89, pK_{a2}= 4.40 meso 25 °C: pK_{a1}= 3.22, pK_{a2}= 4.85
Conjugate base	Bitartrate
Magnetic susceptibility (χ)	−67.5·10^{−6} cm^{3}/mol

Hazards
- GHS labelling
Pictograms	(GHS05: Corrosive)
Signal word	Danger
Hazard statements	H318
Precautionary statements	P280, P305+P351+P338+P310

Related compounds
Other cations	Monosodium tartrate Disodium tartrate Monopotassium tartrate Dipotassium tartrate
Related carboxylic acids	Butyric acid Succinic acid Dimercaptosuccinic acid Malic acid Maleic acid Fumaric acid
Related compounds	2,3-Butanediol; Cichoric acid
- Except where otherwise noted, data are given for materials in their standard state (at 25 °C [77 °F], 100 kPa). verify (what is ?) Infobox references

Tartaric acid is a white, crystalline organic acid that occurs naturally in many fruits, most notably in grapes but also in tamarinds, bananas, avocados, and citrus. Its salt, potassium bitartrate, commonly known as cream of tartar, develops naturally in the process of fermentation. Potassium bitartrate is commonly mixed with sodium bicarbonate and is sold as baking powder used as a leavening agent in food preparation. The acid itself is added to foods as an antioxidant E334 and to impart its distinctive sour taste. Naturally occurring tartaric acid is a useful raw material in organic synthesis. Tartaric acid, an alpha-hydroxy-carboxylic acid, is diprotic and aldaric in acid characteristics and is a dihydroxyl derivative of succinic acid.

== History ==
Tartaric acid has been known to winemakers for centuries– its crude crystalline form as found off top of wine barrels were called tartarum (rendered tartre by Chaucer) or "wine stone". However, chemical extraction and purification was developed in 1769 by the Swedish chemist Carl Wilhelm Scheele.

Tartaric acid played an important role in the discovery of chemical chirality. This property of tartaric acid was first observed in 1832 by Jean Baptiste Biot, who observed its ability to rotate polarized light. Louis Pasteur continued this research in 1847 by investigating the shapes of sodium ammonium tartrate crystals, which he found to be chiral. By manually sorting the differently shaped crystals, Pasteur was the first to produce a pure sample of levotartaric acid.

== Stereochemistry ==
Tartaric acid crystals drawn as if seen through an optical microscope

The naturally occurring form of the acid is dextro tartaric acid or L-(+)-tartaric acid (obsolete name d-tartaric acid). Because it is available naturally, it is cheaper than its enantiomer and the meso isomer. The dextro and levo prefixes are archaic terms. Modern textbooks refer to the natural form as (2R,3R)-tartaric acid (L-(+)-tartaric acid), and its enantiomer as (2S,3S)-tartaric acid (D-(−)-tartaric acid). The meso diastereomer is referred to as (2R,3S)-tartaric acid or (2S,3R)-tartaric acid.

- Dextro and levo form monoclinic sphenoidal crystals and orthorhombic crystals.
- Racemic tartaric acid (racemic acid) forms monoclinic and triclinic crystals (space group P1̅).
- Anhydrous meso tartaric acid form two anhydrous polymorphs: triclinic and orthorhombic.
- Monohydrated meso tartaric acid crystallizes as monoclinic and triclinic polymorphys depending on the temperature at which crystallization from aqueous solution occurs.

Tartaric acid in Fehling's solution binds to copper(II) ions, preventing the formation of insoluble hydroxide salts.

DL-tartaric acid (racemic acid) (when in 1:1 ratio)		mesotartaric acid
dextrotartaric acid (L-(+)-tartaric acid)	levotartaric acid (D-(−)-tartaric acid)	mesotartaric acid

Forms of tartaric acid
Common name	Tartaric acid	Levotartaric acid	Dextrotartaric acid	Mesotartaric acid	Racemic acid
Synonyms		(2S,3S)-tartaric acid (S,S)-tartaric acid (−)-tartaric acid l-tartaric acid (obsolete) levotartaric acid D-tartaric acid D-threaric acid ("unnatural isomer")	(2R,3R)-tartaric acid (R,R)-tartaric acid (+)-tartaric acid d-tartaric acid (obsolete); L-tartaric acid L-threaric acid ("natural isomer")	(2R,3S)-tartaric acid meso-tartaric acid erythraric acid	rac-(2R,3S)-tartaric acid (2RS,3SR)-tartaric acid (±)-tartaric acid DL-tartaric acid dl-tartaric acid (obsolete) paratartaric acid uvic acid
PubChem	CID 875 from PubChem	CID 439655 from PubChem	CID 444305 from PubChem	CID 78956 from PubChem	CID 5851 from PubChem
EINECS number		205-695-6	201-766-0	205-696-1	205-105-7
CAS number	526-83-0	147-71-7	87-69-4	147-73-9	133-37-9

== Production ==
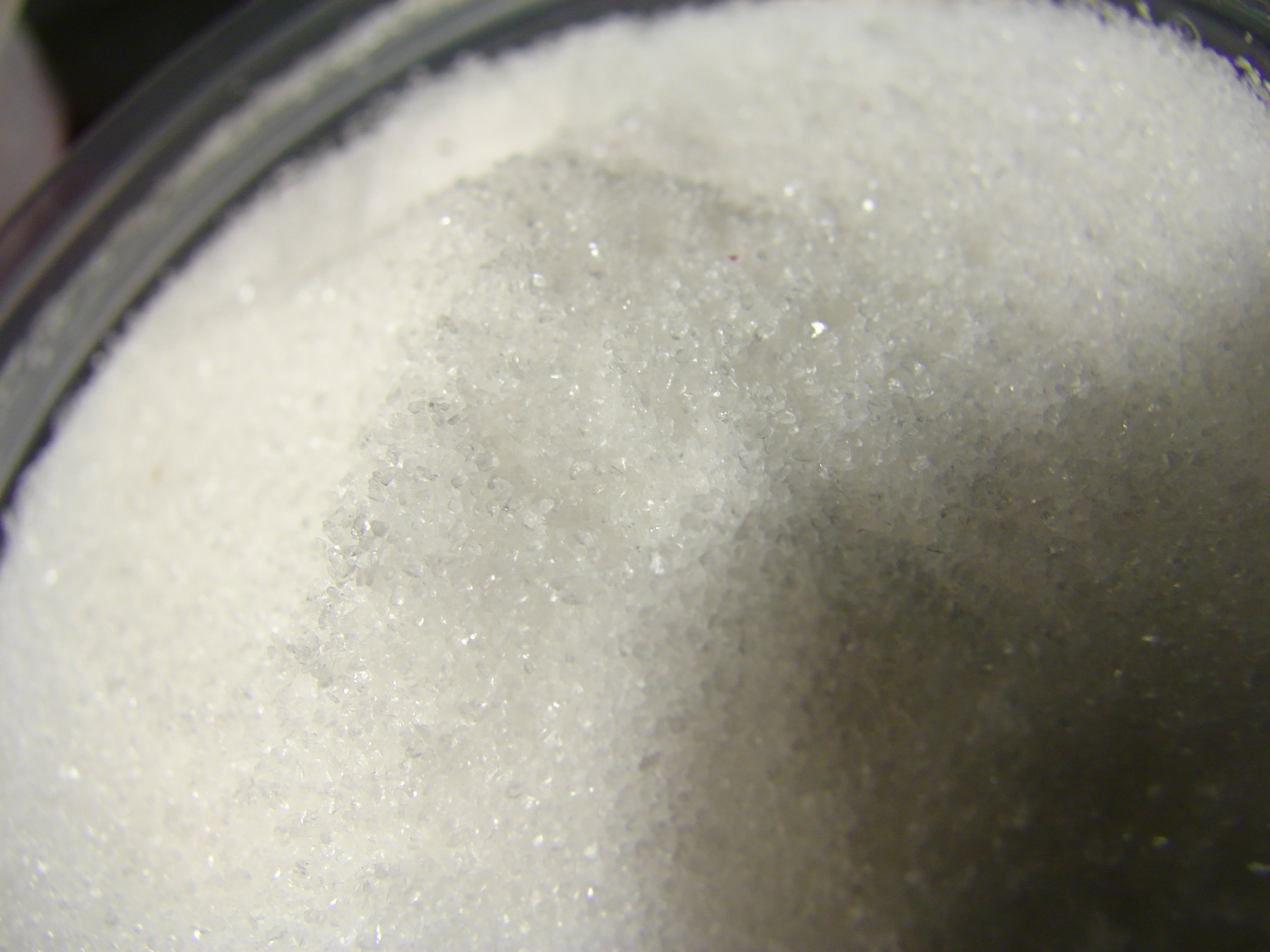
Commercially produced tartaric acid

Almost all commercial tartaric acid is the L-(+) enantiomer, a vinification byproduct. The other enantiomers can be produced for the laboratory through the conventional methods of organic synthesis.

=== L-(+)-Tartaric acid ===
The L-(+)-tartaric acid isomer is obtained from fermentation lees, which mostly consist of potassium bitartrate (KHC_{4}H_{4}O_{6}). This potassium salt is converted to calcium tartrate (CaC_{4}H_{4}O_{6}) upon treatment with calcium hydroxide (Ca(OH)_{2}):

KH(C_{4}H_{4}O_{6}) + Ca(OH)_{2} → Ca(C_{4}H_{4}O_{6}) + KOH + H_{2}O

In practice, higher yields of calcium tartrate are obtained with the addition of calcium sulfate. Calcium tartrate is then converted to tartaric acid by treating the salt with aqueous sulfuric acid:

Ca(C_{4}H_{4}O_{6}) + H_{2}SO_{4} → H_{2}(C_{4}H_{4}O_{6}) + CaSO_{4}

=== Racemic tartaric acid ===
Racemic tartaric acid can be prepared in a multistep reaction from maleic acid. In the first step, the maleic acid is epoxidized by hydrogen peroxide using potassium tungstate as a catalyst.

HO_{2}CCH=CHCO_{2}H + H_{2}O_{2} → HO_{2}C(CHCH)(O)CO_{2}H + H_{2}O

In the next step, the epoxide is hydrolyzed.

HO_{2}C(CHCH)(O)CO_{2}H + H_{2}O → HO_{2}CCH(OH)CH(OH)CO_{2}H

=== meso-Tartaric acid ===
A mixture of racemic acid and meso-tartaric acid is formed when dextro-tartaric acid is heated in water at 165 °C for about 2 days. meso-Tartaric acid can also be prepared from dibromosuccinic acid using silver hydroxide:

HO_{2}CCHBrCHBrCO_{2}H + 2 AgOH → HO_{2}CCH(OH)CH(OH)CO_{2}H + 2 AgBr

meso-Tartaric acid can be separated from residual racemic acid by crystallization, the racemate being less soluble.

== Reactivity ==
L-(+)-tartaric acid, can participate in several reactions. As shown the reaction scheme below, dihydroxymalonic acid is produced upon treatment of L-(+)-tartaric acid with hydrogen peroxide in the presence of a ferrous salt.

HO_{2}CCH(OH)CH(OH)CO_{2}H + H_{2}O_{2} → HO_{2}CC(OH)C(OH)CO_{2}H + 2 H_{2}O

Dihydroxymaleic acid can then be oxidized to tartronic acid with nitric acid.

== Derivatives ==
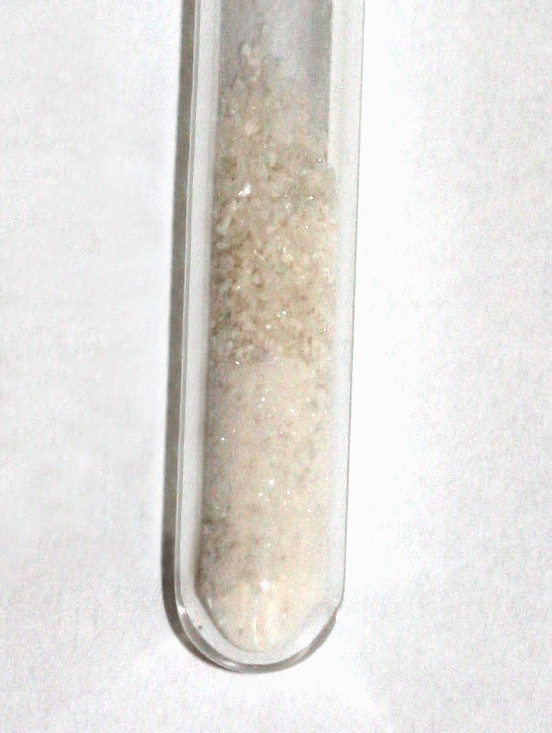
Tartar emetic

Important derivatives of tartaric acid include:

- Sodium ammonium tartrate, the first material separated into its enantiomers
- cream of tartar (potassium bitartrate), used in cooking
- Rochelle salt (potassium sodium tartrate), which has unusual piezoelectric properties
- tartar emetic (antimony potassium tartrate), a resolving agent. Diisopropyl tartrate is used as a co-catalyst in asymmetric synthesis.

Tartaric acid is a muscle toxin, which works by inhibiting the production of malic acid, and in high doses causes paralysis and death. The median lethal dose (LD_{50}) is about 7.5 grams/kg for a human, 5.3 grams/kg for rabbits, and 4.4 grams/kg for mice. Given this figure, it would take over 500 g (18 oz) to kill a person weighing 70 kg (150 lb) with 50% probability, so it may be safely included in many foods, especially sour-tasting sweets. As a food additive, tartaric acid is used as an antioxidant with E number E334; tartrates are other additives serving as antioxidants or emulsifiers.

When cream of tartar is added to water, a suspension results which serves to clean copper coins very well, as the tartrate solution can dissolve the layer of copper(II) oxide present on the surface of the coin. The resulting copper(II)-tartrate complex is easily soluble in water.

== Tartaric acid in wine ==
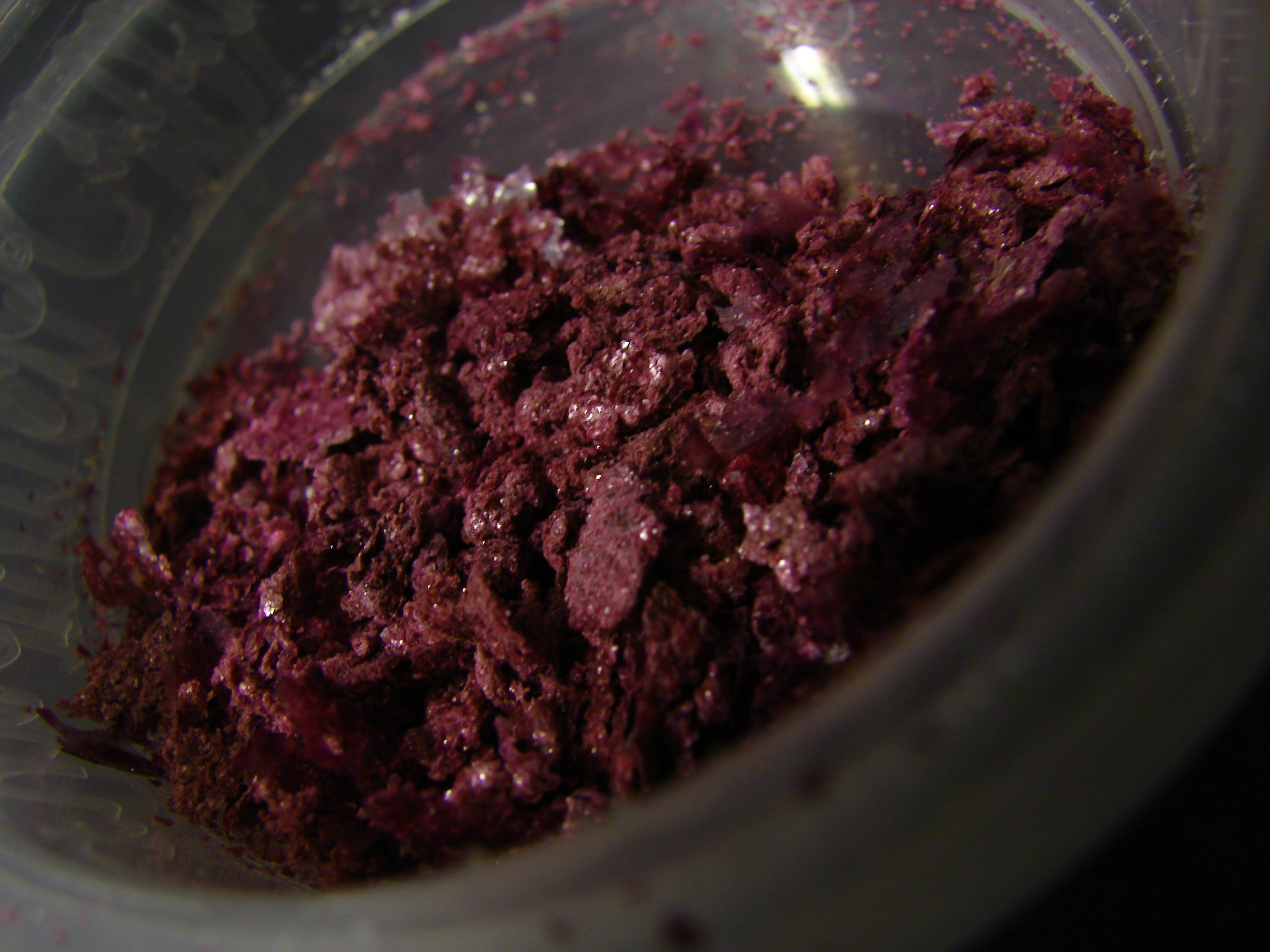
Unpurified potassium bitartrate can take on the color of the grape juice from which it was separated.

Tartaric acid may be most immediately recognizable to wine drinkers as the source of "wine diamonds", the small potassium bitartrate crystals that sometimes form spontaneously on the cork or bottom of the bottle. These "tartrates" are harmless, despite sometimes being mistaken for broken glass, and are prevented in many wines through cold stabilization (which is not always preferred since it can change the wine's profile). The tartrates remaining on the inside of aging barrels were at one time a major industrial source of potassium bitartrate.

Tartaric acid plays an important role chemically, lowering the pH of fermenting "must" to a level where many undesirable spoilage bacteria cannot live, and acting as a preservative after fermentation. In the mouth, tartaric acid provides some of the tartness in the wine, although citric and malic acids also play a role.

== Tartaric acid in fruits ==
Grapes and tamarinds have the highest levels of tartaric acid concentration. Other fruits with tartaric acid are bananas, avocados, prickly pear fruit, apples, cherries, papayas, peaches, pears, pineapples, strawberries, mangoes and citrus fruits.

Trace amounts of tartaric acid have been found in cranberries and other berries.

Tartaric acid is also present in the leaves and pods of Pelargonium plants and beans.

== Applications ==
Tartaric acid and its derivatives have a plethora of uses in the field of pharmaceuticals. For example, it has been used in the production of effervescent salts, in combination with citric acid, to improve the taste of oral medications. The potassium antimonyl derivative of the acid known as tartar emetic is included, in small doses, in cough syrup as an expectorant.

Tartaric acid also has several applications for industrial use. The acid has been observed to chelate metal ions such as calcium and magnesium. Therefore, the acid has served in the farming and metal industries as a chelating agent for complexing micronutrients in soil fertilizer and for cleaning metal surfaces consisting of aluminium, copper, iron, and alloys of these metals, respectively.

== Toxicity in dogs ==
While tartaric acid is well-tolerated by humans and lab animals, an April 2021 letter to the editor of JAVMA hypothesized that the tartaric acid in grapes could be the cause of grape and raisin toxicity in dogs. Two cases of ingestion of cream of tartar caused a similar toxic reaction, with similar symptoms of acute kidney injury and (in one case) similar histological findings in the kidneys of the dogs at autopsy.

A 2022 article expands on the letter with detailed reports of the 2 aforementioned cases of cream of tartar ingestion and 4 new cases of tamarind ingestion. Again, clinical findings were similar. Tamarind is known to contain 8%–18% tartaric acid, much more than the up to 2% (typically 0.35%–1.1%) found in grapes. The authors believe that the assignment of tartaric acid as the culprit also explains the relative lack of incidents from dogs consuming commercial grape juice, jam, and wine, as these go through a process to remove tartrates.

A 2023 study observed tartaric acid toxicity in kidney cells of dogs, but not in human kidney cells.

A 2024 review identified a relationship between grape ingestion and illness in dogs, though the specific type or quantity of grapes that cause toxicity remains unclear. Grape ingestion commonly leads to gastrointestinal and/or renal issues, with treatment depending on the symptoms; outcomes can vary.
