= Mesoxalic acid =

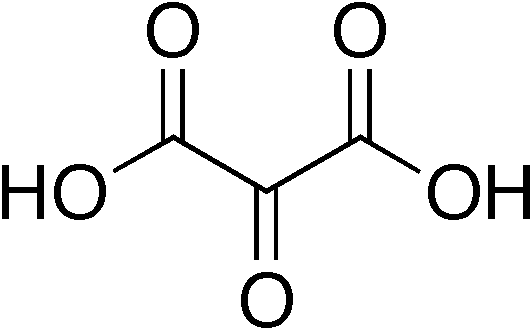
- Structural formula

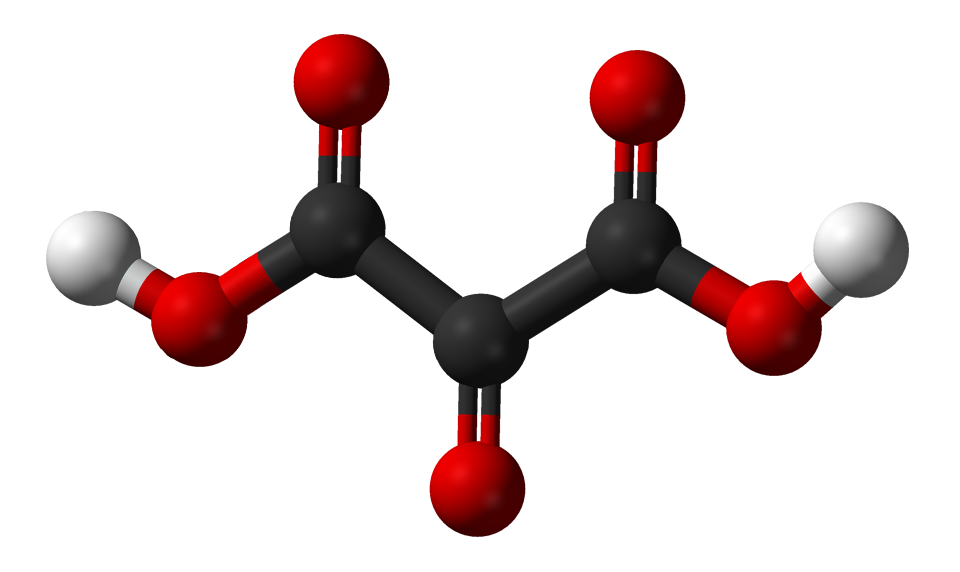
- Ball-and-stick model

Names
- Preferred IUPAC name Oxopropanedioic acid
- Other names Ketomalonic acid Oxomalonic acid α-Ketomalonic acid 2-Oxopropanedioic acid

Identifiers
CAS Number	473-90-5
3D model (JSmol)	Interactive image
ChEBI	CHEBI:30842
ChemSpider	9727
DrugBank	DB03589
ECHA InfoCard	100.006.796
KEGG	C00830
PubChem CID	10132
UNII	62R514HE48
CompTox Dashboard (EPA)	DTXSID3021649
- InChI: InChI=1S/C3H2O5/c4-1(2(5)6)3(7)8/h(H,5,6)(H,7,8) Key: XEEVLJKYYUVTRC-UHFFFAOYSA-N; InChI=1/C3H2O5/c4-1(2(5)6)3(7)8/h(H,5,6)(H,7,8) Key: XEEVLJKYYUVTRC-UHFFFAOYAW
- SMILES: O=C(O)C(=O)C(=O)O

Properties
Chemical formula	C_{3}H_{2}O_{5}
Molar mass	118.045 g/mol
- Except where otherwise noted, data are given for materials in their standard state (at 25 °C [77 °F], 100 kPa). verify (what is ?) Infobox references

Mesoxalic acid, also called oxomalonic acid or ketomalonic acid, is an organic compound with formula C_{3}H_{2}O_{5} or HO−(C=O)_{3}−OH.

Mesoxalic acid is both a dicarboxylic acid and a ketonic acid. It readily loses two protons to yield the divalent anion C_{3}O^{2−}_{5}, called mesoxalate, oxomalonate, or ketomalonate. These terms are also used for salts containing this anion, such as sodium mesoxalate, Na_{2}C_{3}O_{5}; and for esters containing the −C_{3}O_{5}− or −O−(C=O)_{3}−O− moiety, such as diethyl mesoxalate, (C_{2}H_{5})_{2}C_{3}O_{5}. Mesoxalate is one of the oxocarbon anions, which (like carbonate CO^{2−}_{3} and oxalate C_{2}O^{2−}_{4}) consist solely of carbon and oxygen.

Mesoxalic acid readily absorbs and reacts with water to form a product commonly called "mesoxalic acid monohydrate", more properly dihydroxymalonic acid, HO−(C=O)−C(OH)_{2}−(C=O)−OH. In product catalogs and other contexts, the terms "mesoxalic acid", "oxomalonic acid" and so on often refer to this "hydrated" compound. In particular, the product traded as "sodium mesoxalate monohydrate" is almost always sodium dihydroxymalonate.

== Synthesis ==
Mesoxalic acid can be obtained synthetically by hydrolysis of alloxan with baryta water, by warming caffuric acid with lead acetate solution, or from glyceryl diacetate and concentrated nitric acid in ice-cold water. The product can be obtained also by oxidation of tartronic acid or glycerol. Since they are carried out in water, these procedures generally give the dihydroxy derivative.

It is also prepared by the oxidation of glycerol with the help of bismuth(III) nitrate.

== See also ==
- Malonic acid
