= List of listed buildings in Biggar, South Lanarkshire =

This is a list of listed buildings in the parish of Biggar in South Lanarkshire, Scotland.

== List ==
Name	Location	Date Listed	Grid Ref. (Note: Sometimes known as OSGB36, the grid reference (where provided) is based on the British national grid reference system used by the Ordnance Survey. • "Guide to National Grid". Ordnance Survey. • "Get-a-map". Ordnance Survey.)	Geo-coordinates	Notes	LB Number (Note: Historic Environment Scotland assign a unique alphanumeric identifier to each designated site in Scotland, for listed buildings this always begins with "LB", for example "LB12345".)	Image
4 Kirkstyle				55°37′28″N 3°31′31″W	Category B	22253	Upload Photo
8 Kirkstyle				55°37′28″N 3°31′31″W	Category C(S)	22255	Upload Photo
Moat Park Church Kirkstyle				55°37′29″N 3°31′35″W	Category B	22259	Upload Photo
27 And 29 High Street				55°37′23″N 3°31′37″W	Category C(S)	22176	Upload Photo
55 High Street				55°37′25″N 3°31′34″W	Category C(S)	22185	Upload Photo
Part Of 81 High Street, & 83 High Street, In Wynd To Rear				55°37′29″N 3°31′28″W	Category C(S)	22196	Upload Photo
97 & 99 High Street				55°37′28″N 3°31′25″W	Category C(S)	22199	Upload Photo
105 & 107 High Street				55°37′29″N 3°31′24″W	Category B	22200	Upload Photo
Crown Hotel, (109 & 111) High Street				55°37′29″N 3°31′24″W	Category B	22201	Upload Photo
125, 127 And 129 High Street				55°37′29″N 3°31′22″W	Category B	22202	Upload Photo
135 High Street (At Rear Of 133) (Smith's Close)				55°37′29″N 3°31′21″W	Category C(S)	22204	Upload Photo
Elphinstone Hotel, High Street				55°37′30″N 3°31′18″W	Category B	22207	Upload Photo
169 High Street				55°37′30″N 3°31′16″W	Category C(S)	22213	Upload Photo
213 High Street				55°37′33″N 3°31′11″W	Category C(S)	22217	Upload Photo
10, 12 And 14 High Street				55°37′21″N 3°31′38″W	Category C(S)	22222	Upload Photo
94 & 96 High Street				55°37′27″N 3°31′24″W	Category C(S)	22233	Upload Photo
Braebourne 182 High Street				55°37′33″N 3°31′09″W	Category B	22248	Upload Photo
Lindsaylands				55°37′12″N 3°32′47″W	Category B	6461	Upload Photo
Biggar Park South Lodge, Including Walls, Gatepiers And Railings				55°37′05″N 3°32′10″W	Category C(S)	5100	Upload Photo
Station Road, Former Railway Station, Including Principal Building With Wash House, Signal Box, Outbuilding And Goods Shed				55°37′10″N 3°31′36″W	Category B	44553	Upload another image
St Mary's Church Kirkstyle				55°37′30″N 3°31′31″W	Category A	22257	Upload another image
St Mary's Church-Graveyard Kirkstyle				55°37′31″N 3°31′31″W	Category B	22258	Upload Photo
Kirkhouse, Carwood Road				55°37′40″N 3°31′33″W	Category B	22269	Upload Photo
Station Road, 1 And 2 Station Cottages				55°37′10″N 3°31′41″W	Category C(S)	22270	Upload Photo
The Camb 4 Coulter Road				55°37′18″N 3°31′46″W	Category B	22169	Upload Photo
25. High Street				55°37′22″N 3°31′38″W	Category C(S)	22175	Upload Photo
43. High Street				55°37′23″N 3°31′36″W	Category B	22179	Upload Photo
51A High Street				55°37′25″N 3°31′35″W	Category C(S)	22184	Upload Photo
61 High Street (Manse)				55°37′27″N 3°31′36″W	Category C(S)	22187	Upload Photo
63 & 65 High Street				55°37′26″N 3°31′31″W	Category C(S)	22188	Upload Photo
32 High Street				55°37′23″N 3°31′34″W	Category B	22226	Upload Photo
74, 76 & 78 High Street				55°37′26″N 3°31′26″W	Category C(S)	22230	Upload Photo
98 & 100 High Street				55°37′27″N 3°31′23″W	Category C(S)	22234	Upload Photo
Royal Bank Of Scotland 104 High Street				55°37′27″N 3°31′23″W	Category B	22235	Upload Photo
164 And 166 High Street				55°37′30″N 3°31′10″W	Category C(S)	22244	Upload Photo
High House Of Edmonston				55°39′50″N 3°28′45″W	Category B	636	Upload Photo
Edmonston				55°39′53″N 3°28′40″W	Category B	637	Upload Photo
2 North Back Road				55°37′28″N 3°31′31″W	Category C(S)	22260	Upload Photo
71 High Street				55°37′27″N 3°31′29″W	Category C(S)	22190	Upload Photo
85 & 87 High Street				55°37′28″N 3°31′27″W	Category C(S)	22197	Upload Photo
131 And 133 High Street				55°37′29″N 3°31′21″W	Category B	22203	Upload Photo
Fleming Arms, High Street				55°37′30″N 3°31′20″W	Category B	22206	Upload Photo
153 High Street				55°37′30″N 3°31′18″W	Category C(S)	22209	Upload Photo
205 High Street				55°37′32″N 3°31′12″W	Category C(S)	22215	Upload Photo
8 High Street				55°37′20″N 3°31′39″W	Category B	22221	Upload Photo
80, 82 & 84 High Street				55°37′26″N 3°31′25″W	Category C(S)	22231	Upload Photo
86 & 88 High Street				55°37′27″N 3°31′25″W	Category C(S)	22232	Upload Photo
Buildings To Rear Of 136, 138 High Street				55°37′28″N 3°31′15″W	Category C(S)	22241	Upload Photo
162 High Street				55°37′30″N 3°31′10″W	Category C(S)	22243	Upload Photo
168 High Street				55°37′31″N 3°31′10″W	Category C(S)	22245	Upload Photo
Cormiston House And Steading				55°37′10″N 3°34′24″W	Category B	6585	Upload Photo
Lindsaylands, Lodge And Gatepiers				55°37′11″N 3°32′32″W	Category B	6462	Upload Photo
Lindsaylands, Stables				55°37′14″N 3°32′46″W	Category B	6463	Upload Photo
Brownsbank Cottage				55°39′41″N 3°28′19″W	Category A	640	Upload Photo
Building At Rear Of Brookside, The Wynd,				55°37′29″N 3°31′42″W	Category C(S)	22266	Upload Photo
8 The Wynd				55°37′22″N 3°31′42″W	Category C(S)	22267	Upload Photo
37 And 39 High Street				55°37′23″N 3°31′36″W	Category B	22178	Upload Photo
57 High Street				55°37′25″N 3°31′33″W	Category C(S)	22186	Upload Photo
77 & 79 High Street				55°37′28″N 3°31′28″W	Category C(S)	22193	Upload Photo
Part Of 81 High Street, In Wynd To Rear				55°37′29″N 3°31′28″W	Category B	22195	Upload Photo
20 High Street				55°37′21″N 3°31′37″W	Category C(S)	22224	Upload Photo
34 And 36 High Street				55°37′23″N 3°31′34″W	Category C(S)	22227	Upload Photo
116, 118 & 120 High Street				55°37′28″N 3°31′20″W	Category C(S)	22239	Upload Photo
7 Kirkstyle				55°37′26″N 3°31′33″W	Category C(S)	22251	Upload Photo
2 Kirkstyle				55°37′28″N 3°31′31″W	Category B	22252	Upload Photo
Biggar Mill And Millhouse				55°37′36″N 3°31′39″W	Category B	6371	Upload Photo
Langlees Road, Langlees House And Lodge				55°37′30″N 3°32′29″W	Category B	5101	Upload Photo
6 Kirkstyle				55°37′28″N 3°31′31″W	Category B	22254	Upload Photo
16 South Back Road				55°37′26″N 3°31′16″W	Category C(S)	22261	Upload Photo
5 Smiths Close				55°37′30″N 3°31′21″W	Category C(S)	22263	Upload Photo
4 James Square Smiths Close				55°37′30″N 3°31′22″W	Category C(S)	22264	Upload Photo
2, Gasworks Road				55°37′24″N 3°31′39″W	Category A	22171	Upload Photo
Cadger's Brig High Street				55°37′21″N 3°31′41″W	Category A	22173	Upload another image
33 And 35 High Street				55°37′23″N 3°31′36″W	Category B	22177	Upload Photo
45. High Street				55°37′24″N 3°31′35″W	Category B	22180	Upload Photo
47. High Street				55°37′24″N 3°31′34″W	Category B	22181	Upload Photo
Gable End Between Elphinstone Hotel And 153 High Street				55°37′30″N 3°31′19″W	Category C(S)	22208	Upload Photo
165 High Street				55°37′30″N 3°31′16″W	Category B	22212	Upload Photo
201 High Street				55°37′32″N 3°31′12″W	Category C(S)	22214	Upload Photo
207, 209 High Street				55°37′32″N 3°31′11″W	Category C(S)	22216	Upload Photo
215 High Street				55°37′33″N 3°31′11″W	Category B	22218	Upload Photo
30 High Street				55°37′22″N 3°31′35″W	Category B	22225	Upload Photo
180 High Street				55°37′32″N 3°31′09″W	Category C(S)	22247	Upload Photo
Biggar Park Mansion House				55°37′07″N 3°32′19″W	Category B	5098	Upload Photo
Boghall Castle				55°37′01″N 3°31′29″W	Category B	635	Upload Photo
24 South Back Road				55°37′25″N 3°31′24″W	Category B	22262	Upload Photo
49. High Street				55°37′24″N 3°31′34″W	Category B	22182	Upload Photo
69 High Street				55°37′27″N 3°31′31″W	Category C(S)	22189	Upload Photo
73 High Street				55°37′27″N 3°31′29″W	Category C(S)	22191	Upload Photo
89, 91 & 93 High Street				55°37′28″N 3°31′26″W	Category B	22198	Upload Photo
155 High Street				55°37′30″N 3°31′18″W	Category B	22210	Upload Photo
72 High Street				55°37′26″N 3°31′28″W	Category B	22229	Upload Photo
114 High Street				55°37′28″N 3°31′21″W	Category C(S)	22237	Upload Photo
Doocot At Rear Of 116 - 120 High Street				55°37′26″N 3°31′20″W	Category C(S)	22238	Upload Photo
160 High Street				55°37′30″N 3°31′11″W	Category C(S)	22242	Upload Photo
Biggar Park, Stables And Outbuildings				55°37′05″N 3°32′23″W	Category B	5099	Upload Photo
Carwood House				55°38′42″N 3°31′47″W	Category B	639	Upload Photo
Building To Rear Of 8 The Wynd				55°37′23″N 3°31′42″W	Category C(S)	22268	Upload Photo
Crosskeys Hotel, High Street				55°37′22″N 3°31′40″W	Category C(S)	22174	Upload Photo
Davaar, High Street				55°37′28″N 3°31′29″W	Category B	22192	Upload Photo
81 High Street				55°37′28″N 3°31′27″W	Category B	22194	Upload Photo
137 And 139 High Street				55°37′29″N 3°31′20″W	Category C(S)	22205	Upload Photo
219 High Street				55°37′33″N 3°31′10″W	Category B	22219	Upload Photo
16 High Street				55°37′21″N 3°31′38″W	Category C(S)	22223	Upload Photo
Royal Bank Of Scotland 58 High Street				55°37′25″N 3°31′31″W	Category C(S)	22228	Upload Photo
178 High Street				55°37′32″N 3°31′09″W	Category C(S)	22246	Upload Photo
Mossdale, 184 High Street				55°37′33″N 3°31′09″W	Category B	22249	Upload Photo
Ross Square At Rear Of 182 High Street				55°37′32″N 3°31′09″W	Category C(S)	22250	Upload Photo
Edmonston Mill				55°39′36″N 3°28′26″W	Category B	638	Upload Photo
Church Hall, Kirkstyle				55°37′28″N 3°31′33″W	Category C(S)	22256	Upload Photo
Brookside, The Wynd				55°37′22″N 3°31′42″W	Category C(S)	22265	Upload Photo
Gas Showrooms, Gasworks Road				55°37′24″N 3°31′40″W	Category A	22170	Upload another image
Biggar Gasworks				55°37′24″N 3°31′41″W	Category A	22172	Upload another image See more images
51. High Street				55°37′24″N 3°31′35″W	Category B	22183	Upload Photo
161 And 163 High Street				55°37′30″N 3°31′17″W	Category C(S)	22211	Upload Photo
2, 4 And 6 High Street				55°37′20″N 3°31′39″W	Category B	22220	Upload Photo
110 High Street				55°37′27″N 3°31′21″W	Category C(S)	22236	Upload Photo
Biggar Corn Exchange, High Street				55°37′28″N 3°31′18″W	Category B	22240	Upload another image

== Key ==
The scheme for classifying buildings in Scotland is:

- Category A: "buildings of national or international importance, either architectural or historic; or fine, little-altered examples of some particular period, style or building type."
- Category B: "buildings of regional or more than local importance; or major examples of some particular period, style or building type, which may have been altered."
- Category C: "buildings of local importance; lesser examples of any period, style, or building type, as originally constructed or moderately altered; and simple traditional buildings which group well with other listed buildings."

In March 2016 there were 47,288 listed buildings in Scotland. Of these, 8% were Category A, and 50% were Category B, with the remaining 42% being Category C.
