= Susan Aitken =

Scottish politician (born 1971)

Cllr Susan Aitken
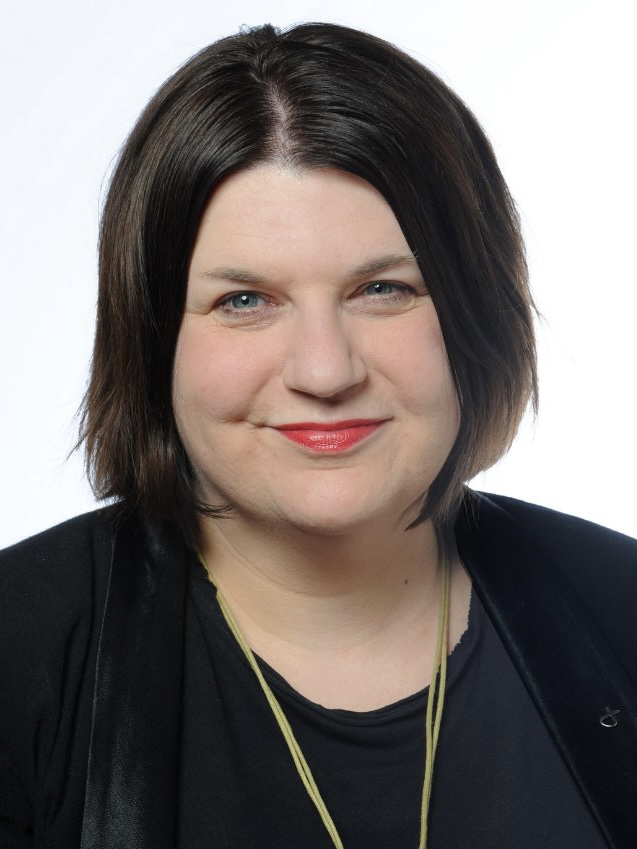
- Official portrait, 2017

Leader of Glasgow City Council
- In office 18 May 2017 – 10 September 2026
- Preceded by: Frank McAveety
- Succeeded by: Ricky Bell

Leader of the Scottish National Party Group on Glasgow City Council
- In office March 2014 – May 2026
- Preceded by: Graeme Hendry
- Succeeded by: Ricky Bell

Glasgow City Councillor for Langside (Ward 7)
- Incumbent
- Assumed office 3 May 2012

Personal details
- Born: November 1971 (age 54) Biggar, Lanarkshire, Scotland
- Party: Scottish National Party
- Education: University of Glasgow, University of Strathclyde

Susan Aitken (born November 1971) is a Scottish politician who served as Leader of Glasgow City Council from May 2017 to September 2026. She was the first Scottish National Party (SNP) politician to lead Glasgow City Council following their electoral success in the May 2017 elections, having been the leader of the SNP group on the council since 2014 and a councillor for the Langside ward since 2012.

== Early life ==
Aitken was born in Biggar, Lanarkshire in November 1971 to Glaswegian parents. After attending Biggar High School, she studied English Literature at the University of Glasgow before completing a Masters Degree at the neighbouring University of Strathclyde.

Originally a member of Scottish Labour, she joined the SNP in 2000, while working as a researcher in the field of health and social policy.

== Political career ==
=== City councillor; 2012–2017 ===
Aitken was elected to represent the ward of Langside in the 2012 Glasgow City Council election. In March 2014, she was made leader of the SNP Group at Glasgow City Council following the resignation of Graeme Hendry.

She was re-elected as a councillor at the 2017 Glasgow City Council election where the SNP became the largest party: breaking 36 years of uninterrupted Labour Party control of Scotland's largest city. Cllr Aitken became Leader of the Council, at the head of a minority SNP administration.

=== City council leader, 2017―2026 ===
Aitken took office as leader of the SNP-led administration on 9 May 2017, formally appointed as such on 18 May 2017, and immediately wrote to COSLA on behalf of Glasgow City Council, seeking to rejoin.

On 19 January 2019, Councillor Aitken's administration announced that it would meet equal pay settlements after Court of Session ruled against Glasgow City Council in a long-running legal dispute which had begun under the previous administration, and which had been a central part of the SNP's 2017 manifesto. Workers later took part in industrial action with support of the GMB and Unison unions over delays to agree compensation payments and a new pay and benefits scheme.

==== Resignation ====
In May 2026, Aitken announced she would stand down as Leader of Glasgow City Council on 10 September 2026. She stood down as Scottish National Party Group Leader with immediate effect. COSLA Resources Spokesperson and Glasgow City Council City Treasurer/Depute Leader Ricky Bell took over with immediate effect.

== Controversies ==
=== Vermin attack dismissal ===
In October 2021, when questioned by the Scottish Affairs Select Committee about council workers who had been attacked by vermin whilst collecting waste, Aitken replied: "All cities have rats." In July 2025 media reported citywide rat infestations. She also suggested that Glasgow's waste problems were the fault of former British Prime Minister Margaret Thatcher.

=== Proposed closure of libraries ===
During the COVID-19 pandemic, libraries across Glasgow closed along with other businesses. During this time, Glasgow City Council had proposed a number of closures across the city's libraries, leading to backlash from the public, campaigners and other politicians. Aitken had earlier issued assurances that no libraries across the city would close. In a tweet dated 13 May 2020 Aitken called lockdown protesters "far right wing bams."

== Personal life ==
In 2020, Aitken was referred to the Standards Commissioner by her predecessor Frank McAveety over allegations she should have declared an interest over a £1 a year rent given to a Community interest company her husband was involved in. Aitken was later found to have broken no conflict of interest rules, having had no locus in the matter, and the Standards Commissioner cleared Aitken of any wrongdoing.
