= Ricky Bell (politician) =

Scottish politician (born 1963)

Cllr Ricky Bell

Leader of Glasgow City Council
- Incumbent
- Assumed office 10 September 2026
- Preceded by: Susan Aitken

Leader of the Scottish National Party Group on Glasgow City Council
- Incumbent
- Assumed office May 2026
- Preceded by: Susan Aitken

Glasgow City Councillor for Govan (Ward 5)
- Incumbent
- Assumed office 4 May 2017

Personal details
- Born: 1963 Govan, Lanarkshire, Scotland
- Party: Scottish National Party

Richard Bell (born 1963) is a Scottish National Party (SNP) politician who has served as Leader of Glasgow City Council since September 2026. He represents the Govan ward and has previously served as Depute Leader of the council and City Treasurer. Bell became leader of Glasgow City Council on 10 September 2026, succeeding Susan Aitken, who had led the council since 2017. He became the second SNP politician to lead the council after Aitken.

== Early life ==
Richard Bell was born in Govan, Glasgow, but grew up in Shawlands and Irvine. Bell lost both parents at a young age; his father at nine, and his mother at fourteen.

Outside his political career, Bell worked in the newspaper business in a number of roles, including as a managing director of Johnston (Falkirk) Ltd. After this, Bell ran a cafe with a partner in Shawlands called 'Bell and Felix'.

== Early political career ==
Bell first became involved in electoral politics in the early 1990s. He stood as the SNP candidate for Cunninghame South at the 1992 United Kingdom general election, receiving 9,007 votes, or 24.2% of the vote, and finishing second to the sitting Labour MP Brian Donohoe. According to the Convention of Scottish Local Authorities (COSLA), Bell was first elected in 1992 and subsequently spent more than two decades working in finance and commercial roles across national news organisations before returning to politics in Glasgow.

Bell returned to electoral politics in Glasgow as an SNP candidate in the 2017 Glasgow City Council election, when he was elected as one of the councillors for the Govan ward. The election formed part of a major change in the political control of Glasgow City Council, with the SNP becoming the largest group and subsequently forming the first SNP-led administration in the city's history.

== Glasgow City Council ==
=== City Treasurer ===
Bell was appointed City Treasurer of Glasgow City Council in 2020. In that capacity he was responsible for a range of financial matters, including the council's revenue budget and financial monitoring. He also became chair of the Strathclyde Pension Fund committee. During the COVID-19 pandemic, Bell was involved in discussions concerning the financial pressures facing Glasgow City Council and the impact of reduced income and additional expenditure on the authority's budget.

As City Treasurer, Bell also supported consideration of policies intended to address poverty and economic insecurity. In 2020 he contributed to a report examining the feasibility of a Citizens' Basic Income pilot in Scotland, stating that Glasgow was interested in exploring its potential to address inequality and poverty.

=== Depute Leader and financial inclusion ===
Following the 2022 Glasgow City Council election, Bell was appointed Depute Leader of Glasgow City Council and retained his position as City Treasurer. He also became City Convener for Financial Inclusion. In his role as Depute Leader and City Treasurer, Bell was involved in the council's response to the 2022–2023 United Kingdom cost-of-living crisis, including the administration of financial support programmes and policies aimed at reducing financial exclusion.

Bell also had responsibility for aspects of Glasgow's anti-poverty and financial inclusion policies. In 2026 he continued to represent the council on issues relating to local government finance and the funding pressures facing Scottish local authorities.

=== COSLA ===
Bell was appointed COSLA's Resources Spokesperson in November 2025. The position involves representing Scottish local government in discussions concerning finance, resources and local government policy. As COSLA Resources Spokesperson, Bell became a prominent advocate for increased financial support for Scottish local authorities. In 2026, he criticised the level of funding available to councils and warned that financial pressures could result in reductions in services and jobs.

=== Leader of Glasgow City Council, 2026– ===
Following Susan Aitken's announcement that she would stand down as leader of Glasgow City Council, Bell became leader of the SNP group on the council in May 2026. On 10 September 2026, Bell was elected Leader of Glasgow City Council at a meeting of the full council. He defeated Glasgow Labour leader Rashid Hussain in the final vote, receiving 39 votes to Hussain's 29. Candidates had also been nominated by the Scottish Greens and Your Party. Bell's election made him the second SNP politician to hold the position of leader of Glasgow City Council. His appointment came less than a year before the scheduled 2027 Glasgow City Council election.

Upon taking office, Bell identified the council's financial position as one of the principal challenges facing his administration. He has also argued for changes to the relationship between Glasgow and neighbouring local authorities, including discussion of greater regional cooperation across the Glasgow city region. Bell has also criticised the financial burden placed on Glasgow by the cost of accommodating refugees and asylum seekers, arguing that the city should receive greater financial support from national government.

== Political views ==
Bell's political work has focused particularly on local government finance, financial inclusion, poverty reduction and the financial sustainability of Glasgow City Council. In his capacity as City Treasurer and COSLA Resources Spokesperson, he has argued for greater financial resources for local authorities and greater flexibility in the way councils can respond to local needs.

As council leader, Bell has indicated that he intends to pursue a more assertive relationship with both the Scottish and United Kingdom governments when seeking additional support or policy changes for Glasgow.

== Personal life ==
Before returning to politics, Bell worked for more than two decades in finance and commercial positions within the newspaper industry. He also operated Bell & Felix, an independent café in Shawlands, Glasgow.
