= Thomas Purdie =

Scottish chemist (1843–1916)

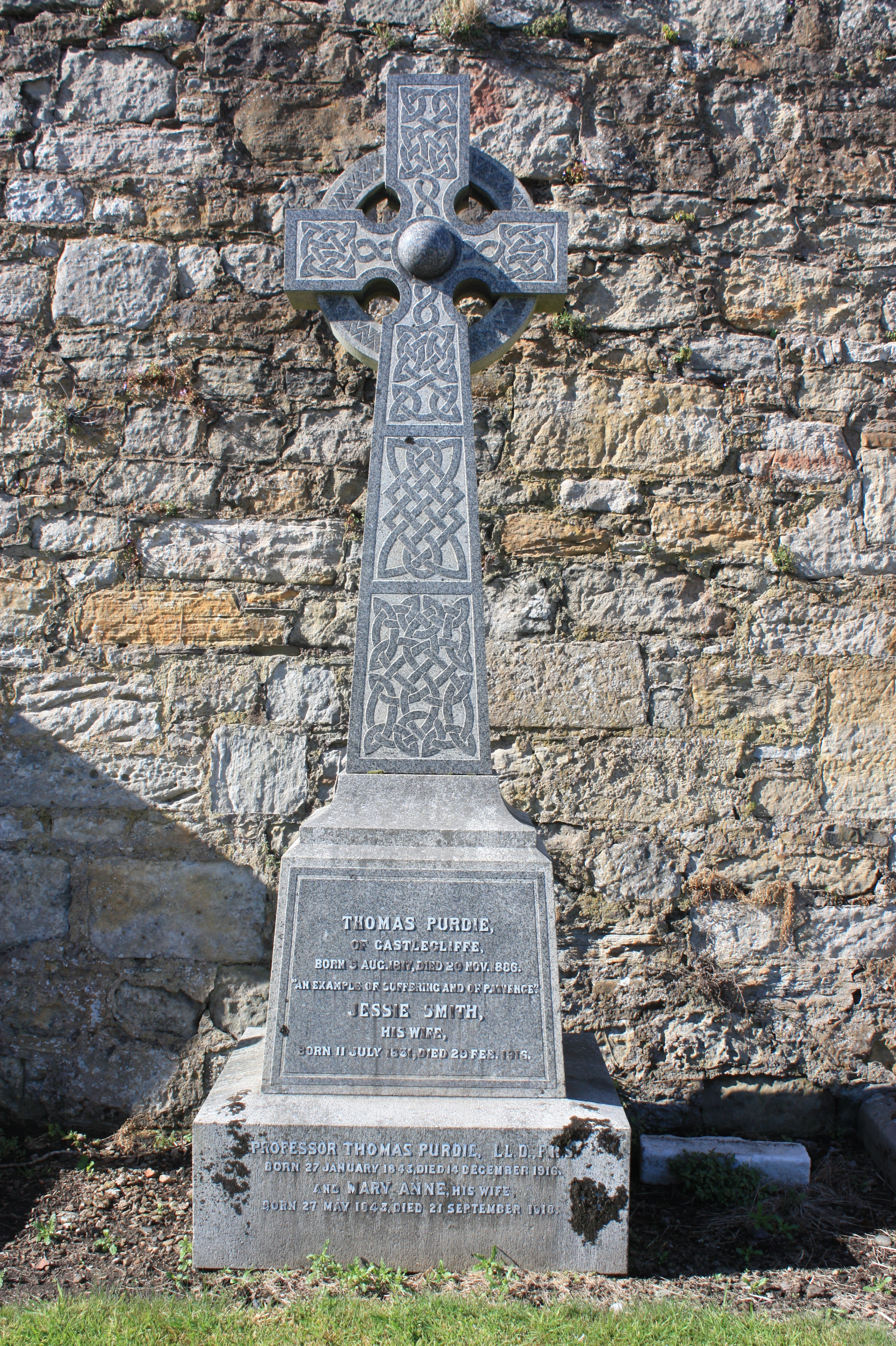
- The grave of Prof Thomas Purdie, St Andrews Cemetery east
- Born: January 27, 1843; Biggar, South Lanarkshire, Scotland
- Died: 14 December 1916 (aged 73); St Andrews, Scotland
- Spouse: Mary Anne Purdie
- Scientific career
- Fields: Organic chemistry
- Institutions: University of St Andrews
- Doctoral advisor: Johannes Wislicenus
- Notable students: Alexander McKenzie

Thomas Purdie FRS LLD (27 January 1843 – 14 December 1916) was a Scottish chemist. With James Irvine, Purdie is known for his work on understanding the chemical structure of simple sugars. The building that houses the School of Chemistry (that he helped found) at the University of St Andrews bears his name.

== Life ==
Purdie was born in Biggar, South Lanarkshire on 27 January 1843, the eldest son of Thomas Purdie (1817–1886) and his wife Margaret Smith (1831-1916). The family spent seven years in South America during his youth. His father purchased Castlecliffe in St Andrews around 1870 and, following a conversation with Thomas Henry Huxley, Thomas decided to train as an industrial chemist.

Around 1871, he joined the Royal School of Mines under Frankland in London, then went to Würzburg University in Germany where he received a doctorate (PhD) in Chemistry. He spent some time teaching Chemistry in South Kensington and then in Newcastle-under-Lyme.

In 1884, he became Professor of Chemistry at St Andrews University. His students included Alexander McKenzie. In 2014, during a clear-out at St Andrews an early periodic table wall chart was found, established to have been purchased by Purdie in 1885.

He retired in 1909, and died in St Andrews, on 14 December 1916, aged 73. He is buried with his parents in the eastern cemetery extension to St Andrews Cathedral churchyard. The grave lies against the main step in ground level, just below the upper terrace.

== Family ==
He was married to Mary Anne (1843–1918).
