= River Clyde =

River in Scotland

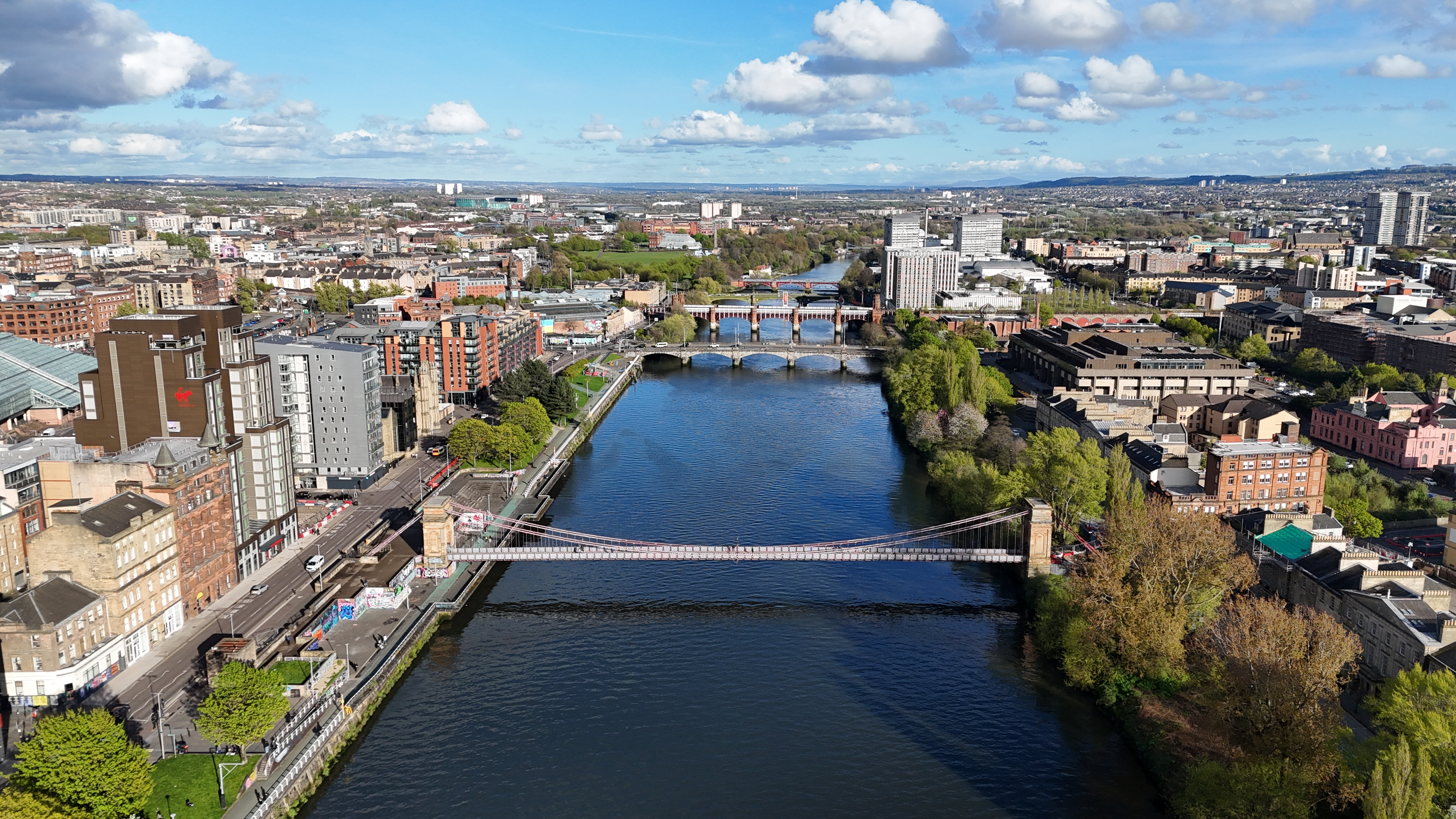
- The River Clyde running through the city of Glasgow
- Native name: Abhainn Chluaidh (Scottish Gaelic)

Location
- Country: Scotland
- Sovereign state: United Kingdom
- Council areas: South Lanarkshire, North Lanarkshire, Glasgow, Renfrewshire, West Dunbartonshire, Inverclyde, Argyll and Bute
- City: Glasgow

Physical characteristics
- Source: Lowther Hills in South Lanarkshire
  - location: South Lanarkshire, Scotland
  - coordinates: 55°24′23.8″N 3°39′8.9″W
- Mouth: Firth of Clyde
  - location: Tail of the Bank, between Greenock and Ardmore Point near Helensburgh, Scotland
  - coordinates: 55°58′12″N 4°45′15″W
- Length: 110 mi (180 km)
- Basin size: 1,545 mi^{2} (4,000 km^{2})

Basin features
- Designation

Ramsar Wetland
- Official name: Inner Clyde Estuary
- Designated: 5 September 2000
- Reference no.: 1036

The River Clyde (/klaɪd/; Scottish Gaelic: Abhainn Chluaidh, pronounced [ˈavɪɲ ˈxl̪ˠuəj]) is a major river of western Scotland and the second-longest in the country at about 170 kilometres (110 mi) in length. Its river network extends to 4,244 km and drains a basin of 1,903 km^{2}, expanding to 3,854 km^{2} when the Clyde estuary system with the Kelvin, White Cart, Black Cart and Leven is included. Around 1.79 million people, 33.8% of Scotland's population, live within this catchment. The river rises in the Lowther Hills and flows north-west through South Lanarkshire and Glasgow before deepening into the Firth of Clyde past the Tail of the Bank off Greenock. The drainage basin of the Clyde very closely resembles the county borders of historic Lanarkshire, which was therefore once known as Clydesdale.

Shoals and shallows meant only small vessels could use the river, and in 1688 Glasgow merchants built Port Glasgow 5.4 kilometres (3.4 mi) upriver for seagoing ships. From the late 18th century the upper estuary and river through Glasgow were systematically engineered using groynes, longitudinal training walls and continuous dredging, and by removing rocky obstructions such as a large part of the Elderslie Rock. This enabled ocean-going access and supported Glasgow's rise as a world centre of shipbuilding and marine engineering in the 19th and 20th centuries.

Greenock Ocean Terminal brought container shipping to the Clyde in 1969, and most commercial deep-water functions migrated down the estuary, while the upper river corridor has seen major regeneration in Glasgow. Environmental quality has improved from historic industrial lows, though legacy contaminants and periodic low-oxygen episodes in the outer firth have been reported.

== Etymology ==
The earliest attested form of the name Clyde is Klōta, recorded by the 2nd-century geographer Ptolemy in his Geographia (Book II, Chapter 3, §2). The river appears as Clota in the work of the Roman historian Tacitus, referring to the Firth of Clyde in his account of Agricola's campaigns (Agricola, ch. 23). Among Brittonic-speaking inhabitants, the river was known as Clut or Clud, forms preserved in the medieval names Alt Clut ("Rock of the Clyde", i.e. Dumbarton) and Ystrad Clud ("Valley of the Clyde", Strathclyde). The modern form Clyde derives from these Brittonic names, later passing through Gaelic as Cluaidh. W. J. Watson, Alan G. James, and Ranko Matasović connect the hydronym with a Common Brittonic or Proto-Celtic root Cloutā / Clōtā associated with "washing" or "cleansing"; compare the Indo-European root klū- "wash, clean", also seen in Latin cluēre "to cleanse, purify". Modern Scottish place-name authorities likewise interpret Clota as "the cleanser" or "the pure one." Watson argued in 1926 that Clota was originally the name of a river goddess personifying the Clyde. Later writers on Celtic religion, such as James MacKillop, note this as a plausible but speculative interpretation, consistent with the wider tradition of rivers in Celtic Europe being associated with female tutelary deities, however no direct inscriptions or contemporary evidence for a goddess named Clota survive.

== History ==
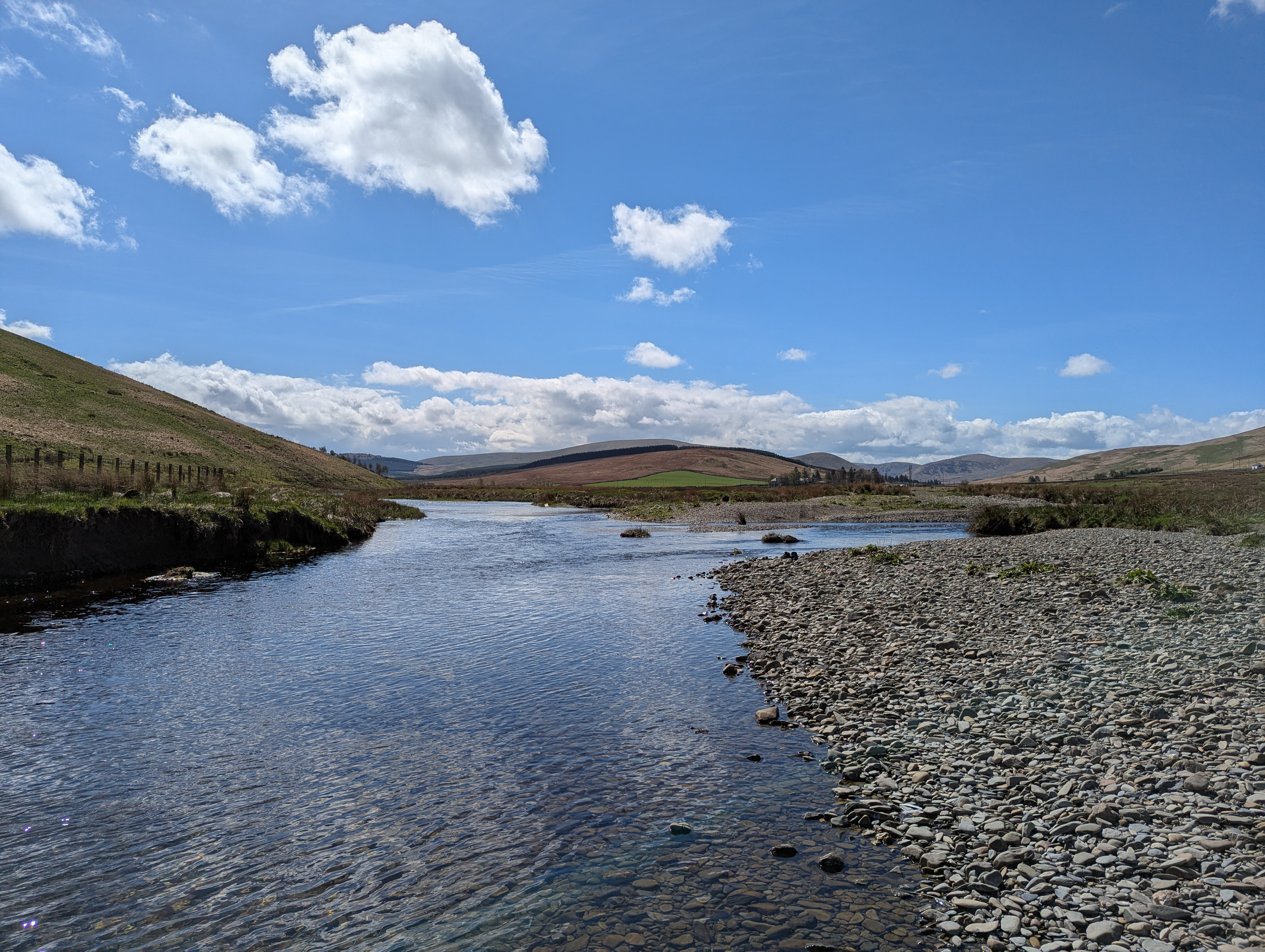
The confluence of the Daer and Potrail Waters, which marks the beginning of the Clyde proper

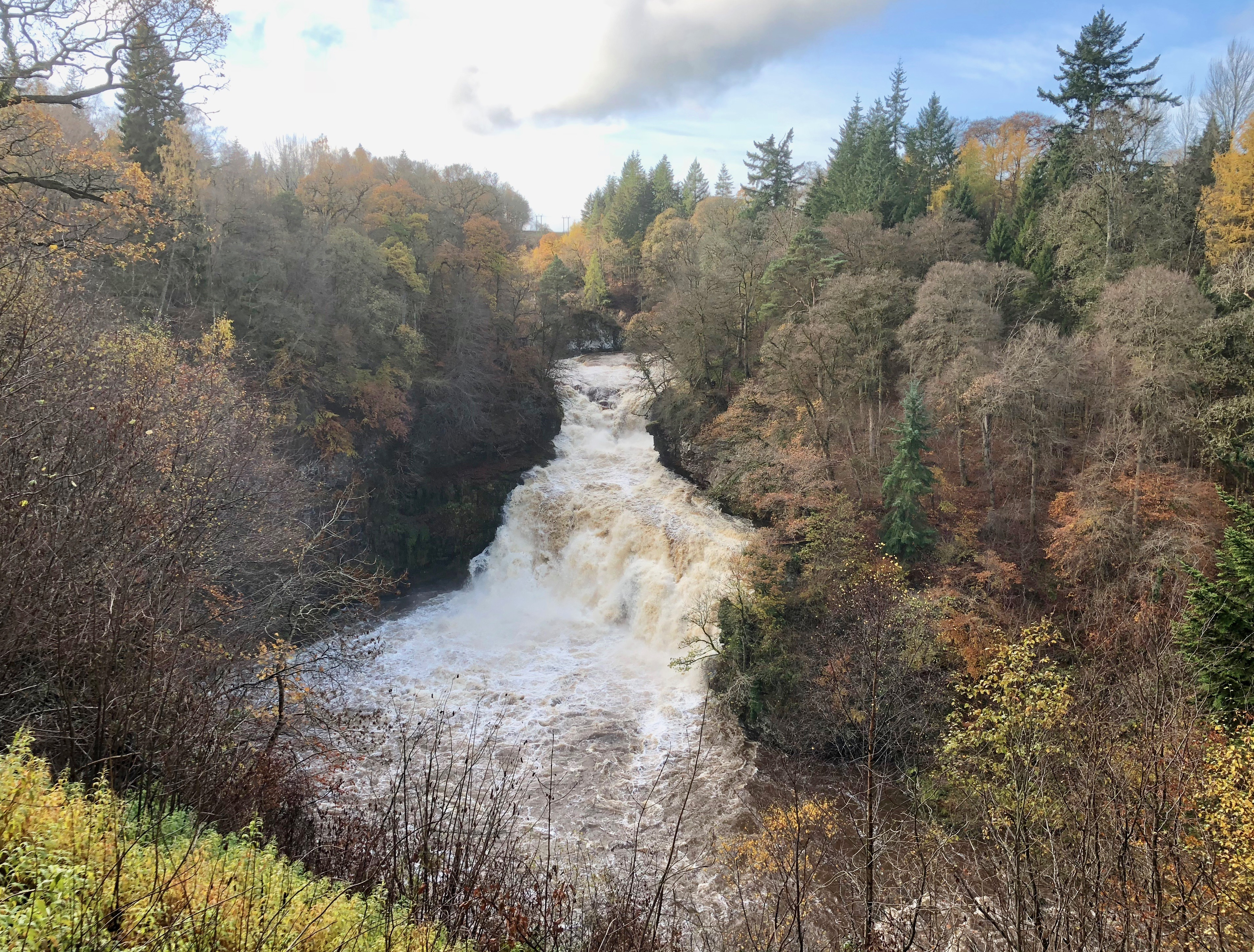
The Falls of Clyde

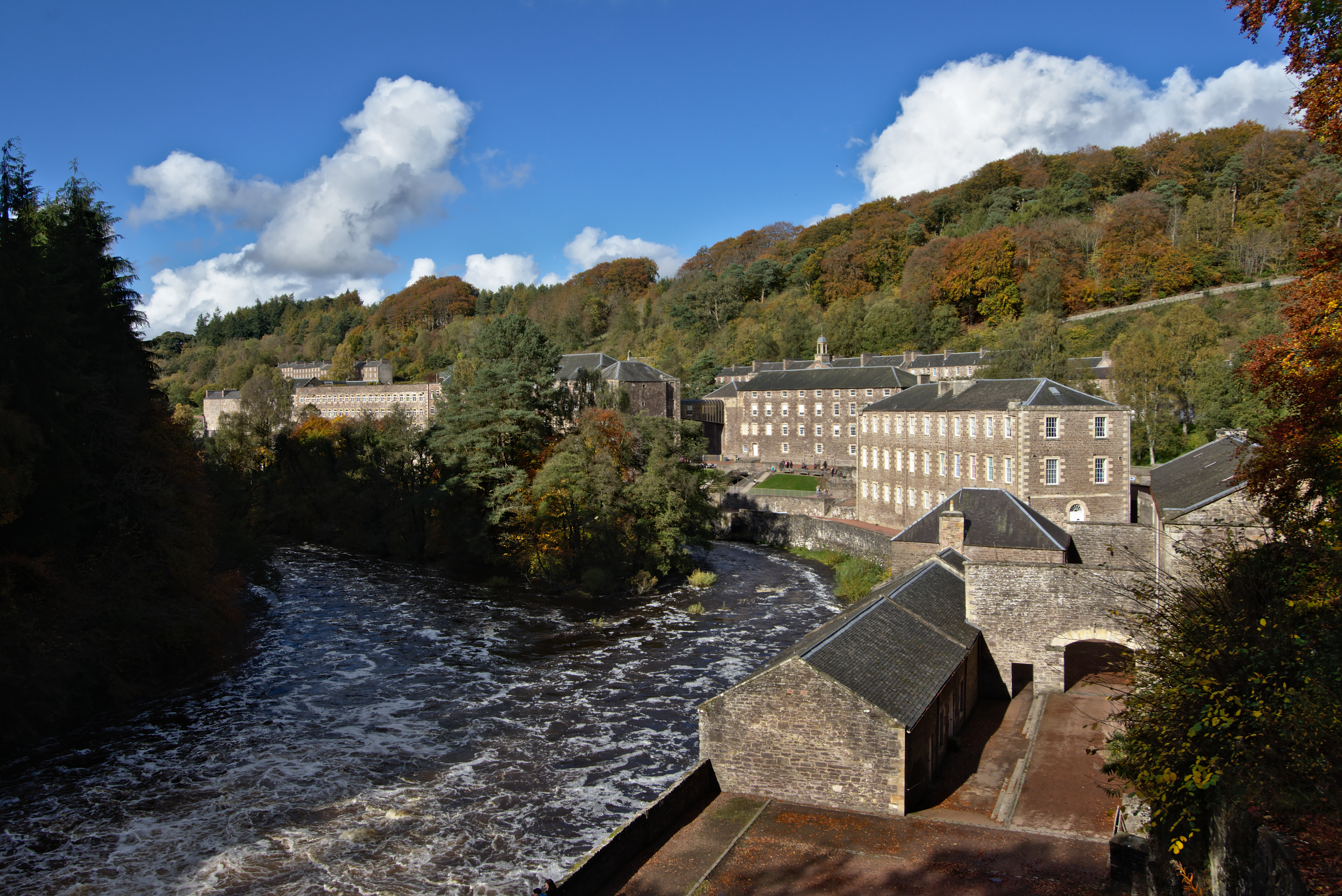
The Clyde flowing past New Lanark

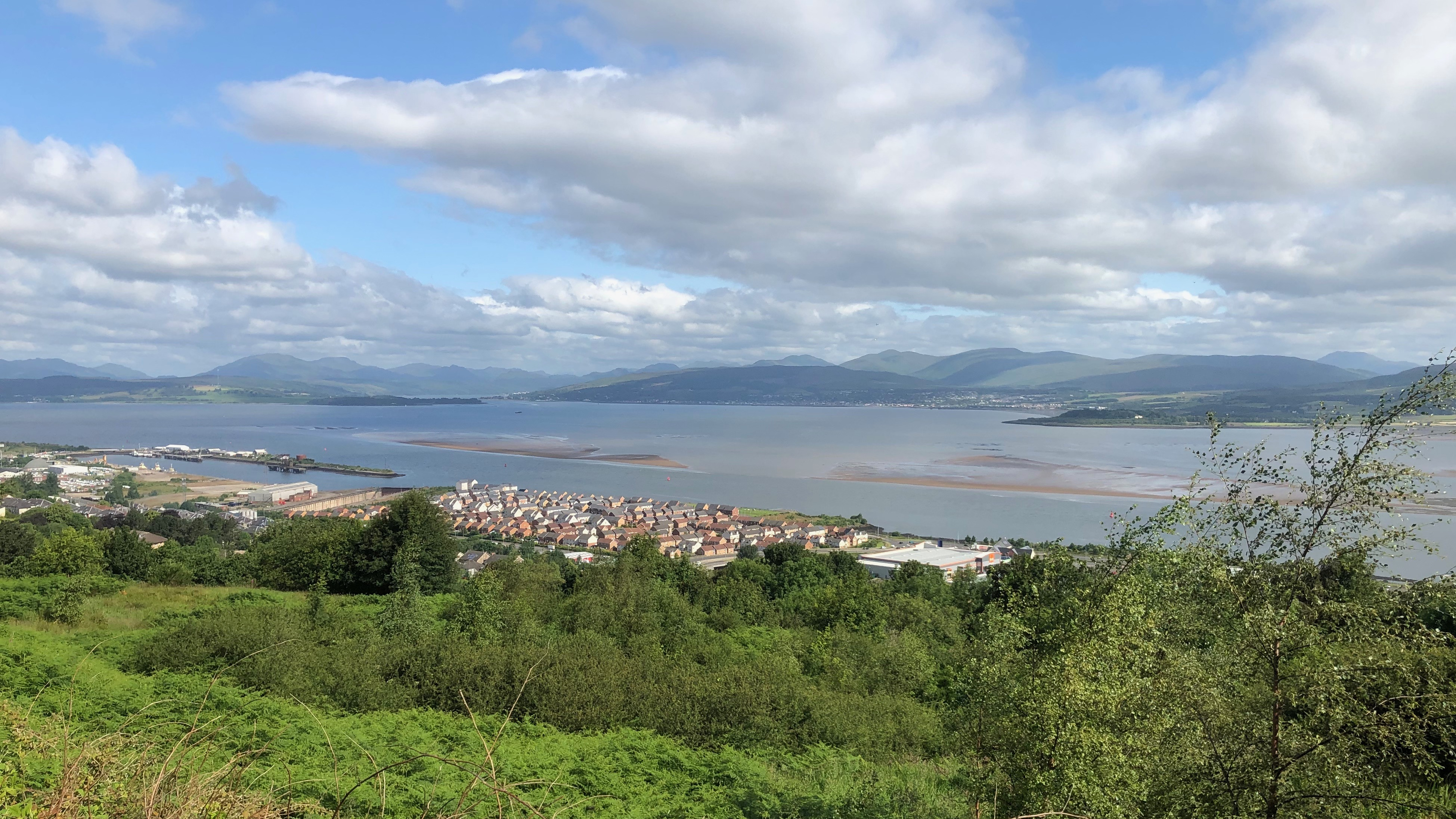
River Clyde navigable channel and sandbanks, leading to the Tail of the Bank at the Firth of Clyde, seen from Port Glasgow looking over the redeveloped Lithgows shipyard site and Greenock's Great Harbour. The Gare Loch is ahead, Ardmore Point to the right.

=== Prehistory ===
Humans have settled along the Clyde since the Paleolithic era. Artifacts dating from 12,000 BC have been found near Biggar, a rural town close to the river. Biggar is home to an archeological site at which Britain's most ancient artifacts have been unearthed. Prehistoric canoes, used by ancient peoples for transport or trade, have been found in the river. There are a number of Mesolithic sites along the Clyde, especially in the Upper Clyde Valley. Permanent settlements and structures, including what is believed to be a temple to moon gods in Govan, were constructed in the area during the Neolithic and Bronze Ages. Celtic art, language, and other aspects of culture began spreading to the area from the south during this period, and prehistoric artifacts suggest that, by around 1000 BCE, they had become the dominant cultural influences there.

=== Ancient history ===
Before the legions of the Roman Empire arrived in southern Scotland, the river and surrounding area had been settled by the Brythonic-speaking Damnonii tribe. It has been suggested that a Damnonii town called Cathures was located there and was the precursor to modern Glasgow. The Damnonii tribe originally likely distributed power among individual chiefdoms, but at some point before 500 AD the political framework was a British culture of Welsh speakers that was politically unified and formed a centralised kingdom known as Alt Clut, representing the power centre at Dunbarton Rock.

None of the documentary or archaeological evidence from the period when the Roman legions arrived suggests that battles took place in the area. Therefore the Roman legions and Damnonii tribespeople are assumed to have been on good terms and to have co-operated by means of trade and the exchange of military information. The Romans did, however, construct several forts (castra) in the area, notably on the banks of the Clyde. These include Castledykes, Bothwellhaugh, and Old Kilpatrick and Bishopton. The Romans also constructed several roads along the river, both small ones and larger ones designed to be used as trade routes and to carry entire legions. The Antonine Wall, which lies only a few miles from the river, was constructed later by the Romans as a means of defending the area against invasion by the Picts. Despite the strategic location and flat terrain of Glasgow and the surrounding Clyde basin, no Roman civilian settlement was ever constructed. Instead, the region may have functioned as a frontier zone between the Roman province known as Britannia Inferior and the Caledonians, an indigenous group that was hostile to the Romans.

=== Kingdom of Strathclyde ===
Strathclyde was founded as an independent unified British kingdom, quite some centuries after the Roman occupation of Britain. The kingdom's core territory and much of its arable land was located around the Clyde basin in the area traditionally associated with Alt Clut. The kingdom was ruled from its original capital, the near impenetrable Alt Clut fortress (Dumbarton Rock), which was situated on the river and overlooked much of the estuary. This fortress was noteworthy enough to have been referred to at the time in several letters and poems about Sub-Roman Britain, written by Gildas and others. Strathclyde remained a powerful kingdom during the early medieval period in Britain. It was also a reservoir of native Welsh culture: Its territory expanded along the Clyde Vae Southern Uplands and Ayrshire, and eventually southwards into Cumbria.

Govan Old Parish Church originated in the 5th or 6th century. In the 7th century, Saint Mungo established a new Christian community on the banks of the Molendinar Burn, a tributary of the Clyde, potentially replacing Cathures if this is assumed to have occupied the same locus. This community was the beginnings of what would become the city of Glasgow. Several villages along the Clyde that were founded in or before this period have endured to this day, and have grown to become towns, including Llanerc (Lanark), Cadzow (Hamilton), and Rhynfrwd (Renfrew). The fortress of Altclut fell in the Siege of Dumbarton of 870 AD, when a force of Norse-Irish raiders from the Kingdom of Dublin sacked it. After that, the kingdom, now politically weakened, possibly moved its capital to Govan. However, it never fully recovered, and in the 11th century it was annexed by the Kingdom of Alba. It did however retain some autonomy under the Church of Glasgow, which became the secular successors of much of the territory when it was treated as a Principality of the Scottish Crown.

=== Medieval and early modern history ===
In the 13th century, Glasgow, then still a small town, built its first bridge over the river Clyde. This was an important step in its ability to eventually grow into a city. The establishment, in the 15th century, of both the University of Glasgow and the Archdiocese of Glasgow, vastly increased the importance of the town within Scotland. From the early modern period onwards, the Clyde began to be used commercially as a trade route; trade between Glasgow and the rest of Europe became commonplace. In the centuries that followed, the Clyde became increasingly vital to both Scotland and Britain as a major trade route for exporting and importing resources.

=== Port authority ===
Clyde Navigation Act 1840
- Act of Parliament
- Parliament of the United Kingdom
- Long title: An Act for further deepening and improving the River Clyde, and enlarging the Harbour of Glasgow, and for constructing a Wet Dock in connexion with the said River and Harbour.
- Citation: 3 & 4 Vict. c. cxviii

Dates
- Royal assent: 4 August 1840
Other legislation
| Repealed by | Clyde Navigation Consolidation Act 1858 |

Status: Repealed

Clyde Navigation Consolidation Act 1858
- Act of Parliament
- Parliament of the United Kingdom
- Long title: An Act to consolidate and amend the Acts relating to the River Clyde and Harbour of Glasgow.
- Citation: 21 & 22 Vict. c. cxlix

Dates
- Royal assent: 2 August 1858

Clyde Port Authority Confirmation Act 1965
- Act of Parliament
- Parliament of the United Kingdom
- Long title: An Act to confirm a Provisional Order under the Private Legislation Procedure (Scotland) Act 1936, relating to the Clyde Port Authority.
- Citation: 1965 c. xlv

Dates
- Royal assent: 22 December 1965
Other legislation
| Relates to | Private Legislation Procedure (Scotland) Act 1936 |

Text of statute as originally enacted

The Clyde Navigation Trust was initially formed in 1840 by the Clyde Navigation Act 1840 (3 & 4 Vict. c. cxviii), and then reconstituted under the Clyde Navigation Consolidation Act 1858 (21 & 22 Vict. c. cxlix). The Clyde Port Authority Confirmation Act 1965 (c. xlv) replaced the Clyde Navigation Trust, the Greenock Harbour Trust and the Clyde Lighthouses Trust with the Clyde Port Authority from 1 January 1966, which was renamed to 'Clydeport', and was privatisated in 1992. In 2003 it was acquired by Peel Holdings.

== Course ==
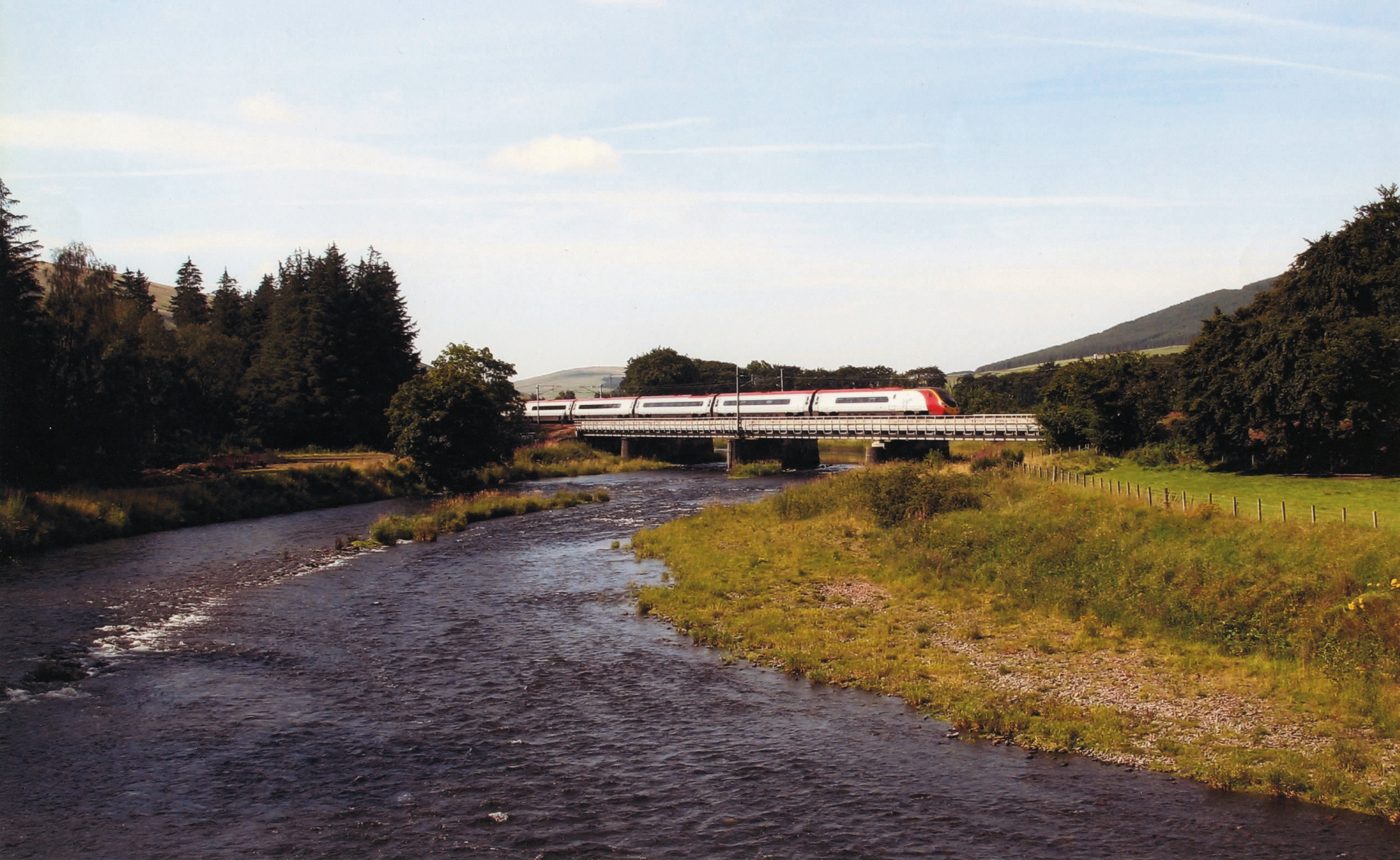
A Pendolino train passing over the Clyde on the West Coast Main Line

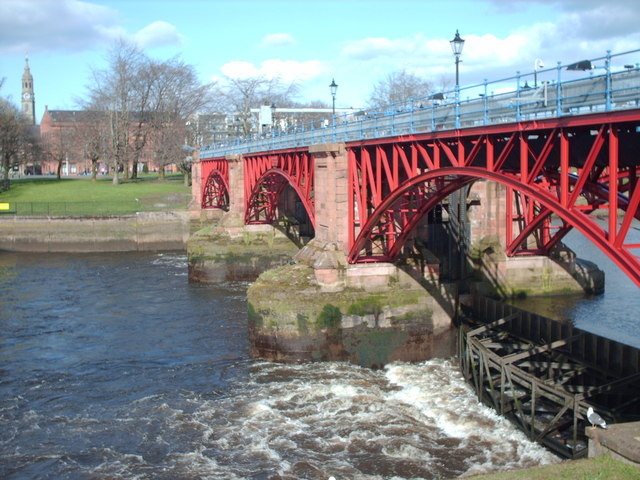
The tidal weir at Glasgow Green, which marks the upper limit of tidal water

The Clyde is formed by the confluence of two streams, the Daer Water (the headwaters of which are dammed to form the Daer Reservoir) and the Potrail Water. The Southern Upland Way crosses both streams before they meet at Watermeetings (grid reference NS953131) to form the River Clyde proper. At this point, the Clyde is only 10 km (6 mi) from Tweed's Well, the source of the River Tweed, and is about the same distance from Annanhead Hill, the source of the River Annan. From there, it meanders northeastward before turning to the west, where its flood plain serves as the site of many major roads in the area, then reaches the town of Lanark, where the late 17th- and early 18th-century industrialists David Dale and Robert Owen built mills and the model settlement of New Lanark on the banks of the Clyde. The mills harnessed the power of the Falls of Clyde, the most spectacular of which is Cora Linn. A hydroelectric power station still generates 11MW of electricity there today, although the mills have now become a museum and World Heritage Site.

The river then makes its way northwest, past the towns of Wishaw to the east of it and Larkhall to the west of it. The river's surroundings here become increasingly suburban. Between the towns of Motherwell and Hamilton, the course of the river has been altered to create an artificial loch within Strathclyde Park. Part of the original course can still be seen: It lies between the island and the eastern shore of the loch. The river then flows through Blantyre and Bothwell, where the ruined Bothwell Castle stands on a defensible promontory.

As it flows past Uddingston and into the southeastern part of Glasgow, the river begins to widen, meandering through Cambuslang, Rutherglen, and Dalmarnock, and past Glasgow Green. From the Tidal Weir westwards, the river is tidal: a mix of fresh and salt water.

Over three centuries the river has been engineered and widened as it passes through Glasgow city centre towards the open sea. Shipping and shipbuilding developed in Glasgow and its neighbouring industrial burghs of Govan and Partick; with the Clyde, including its lower reaches, becoming for a time the leading centre of world shipbuilding.

The river then flows west, out of Glasgow, past Renfrew, under the Erskine Bridge, and past Dumbarton on the northern shore and the sandbank at Ardmore Point between Cardross and Helensburgh. Opposite, on the southern shore, is the last remaining Lower Clyde shipyard, at Port Glasgow. The river continues on past the port of Greenock to the Tail of the Bank, where the river merges into the Firth of Clyde. Here at the mouth of the Clyde, there is currently a significant ecological problem of oxygen depletion in the water column.

== Hydrology and hydraulics ==
=== Discharge and catchment ===
The Clyde drains a mixed upland, agricultural and urban catchment. The upper moorland basin consists of rough grazing and forestry, the middle catchment of arable and pastoral farming, and the lower catchment is heavily urbanised. At Daldowie on the upper tidal Clyde, long-term records (1963–2019) give a mean annual discharge of 48.3 m^{3}/s, with a maximum recorded flow of 560.5 m^{3}/s on 24 January 2018. Much of the river's surface water quality is rated 'Moderate', ranging from 'High' in upland tributaries to 'Bad' in some urban tributaries, while groundwater quality is rated 'Poor' in both upland and urban areas under the Water Framework Directive.

=== Tide and estuary dynamics ===
The Clyde estuary is semi-diurnal and strongly mixed. The principal lunar constituent M2 is dominant, but shallow-water harmonics (M4, M6) in the upper river make the tide notably non-sinusoidal at Glasgow, with a characteristic double flood peak. Modern tide-gauge records show that M2 amplitude increases from the outer firth to Greenock and upriver, and that low-frequency non-tidal variability is highly coherent between Greenock and Glasgow. Phase relationships suggest the system often behaves as a standing wave basin rather than a progressive wave, consistent with the storage-area interpretation long used in Clyde engineering design. For the wider firth, tide–surge interactions and external forcing from the Irish Sea modulate currents and energy fluxes.

=== Tidal limit and control ===
Within the city, the Clyde Tidal Weir at Glasgow Green marks the practical upper tidal limit and separates the fluvial reach from the estuary for water-level management.

== Industrial growth ==
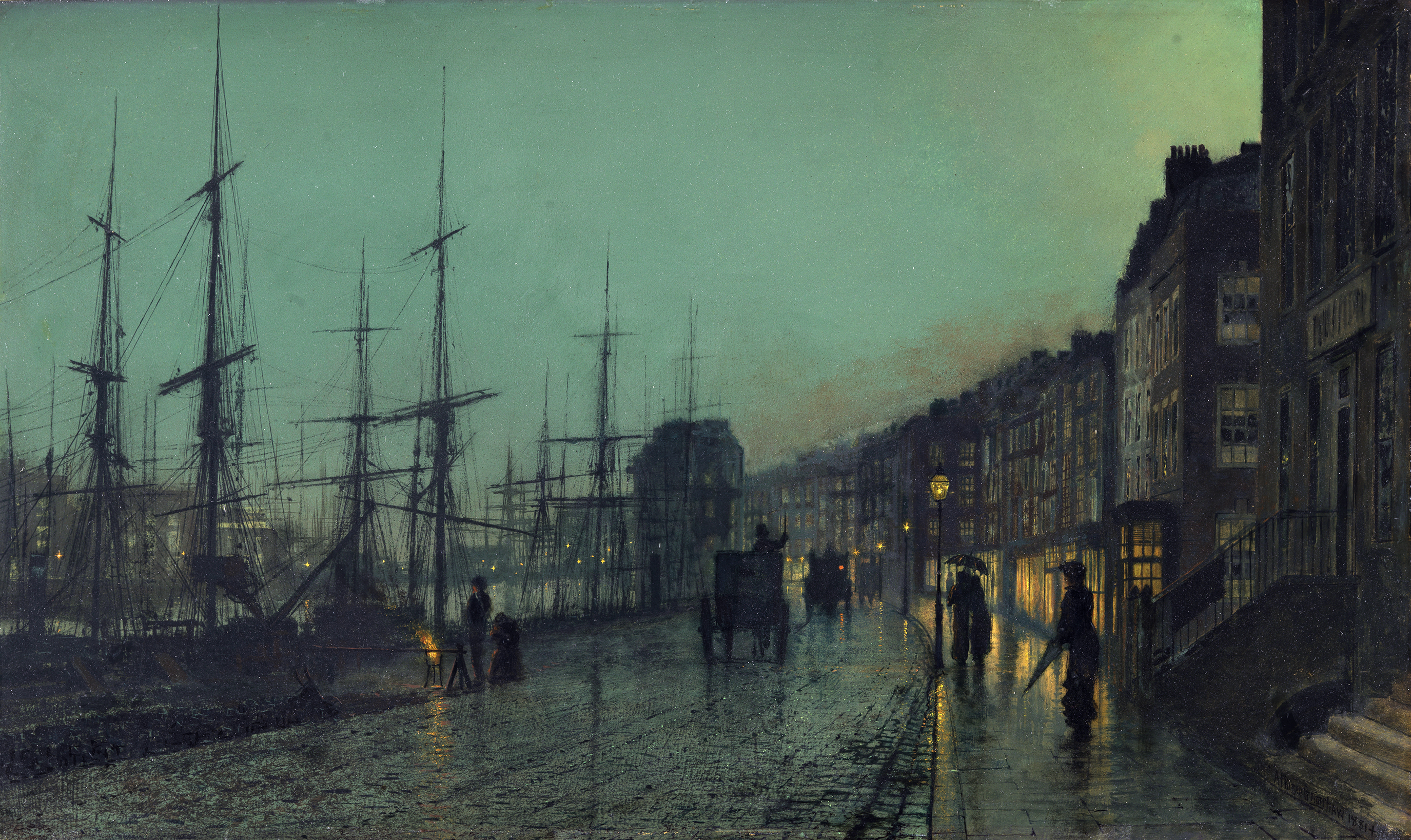
Shipping on the Clyde in Glasgow, by John Atkinson Grimshaw, 1881

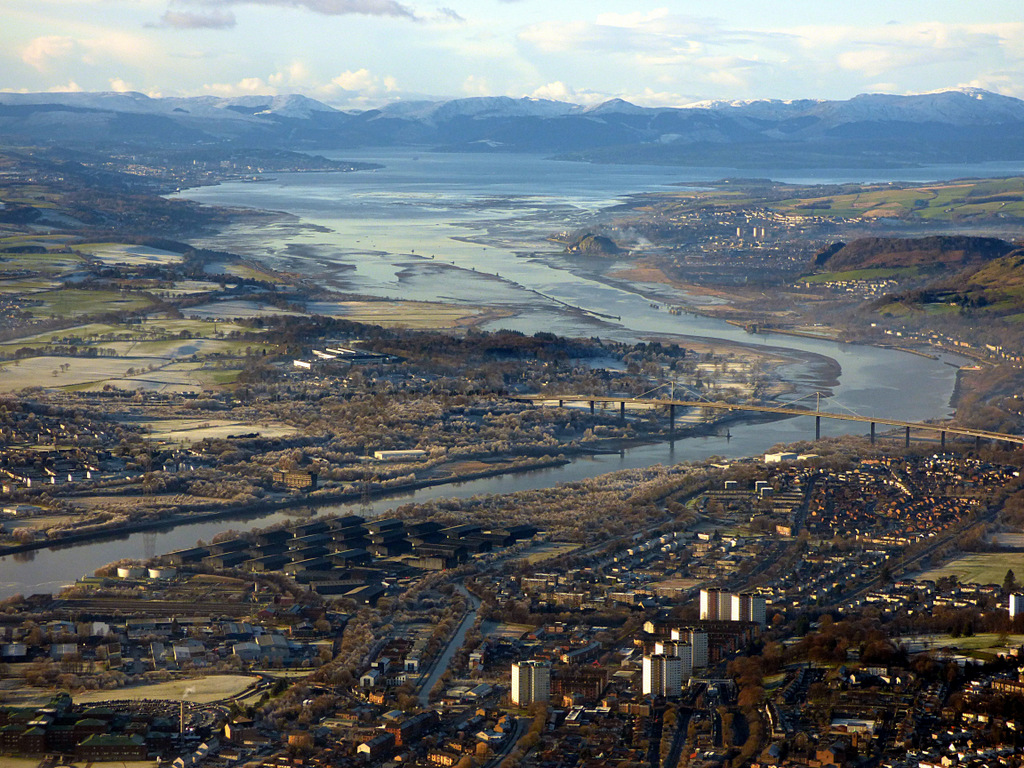
Aerial view of the Clyde estuary

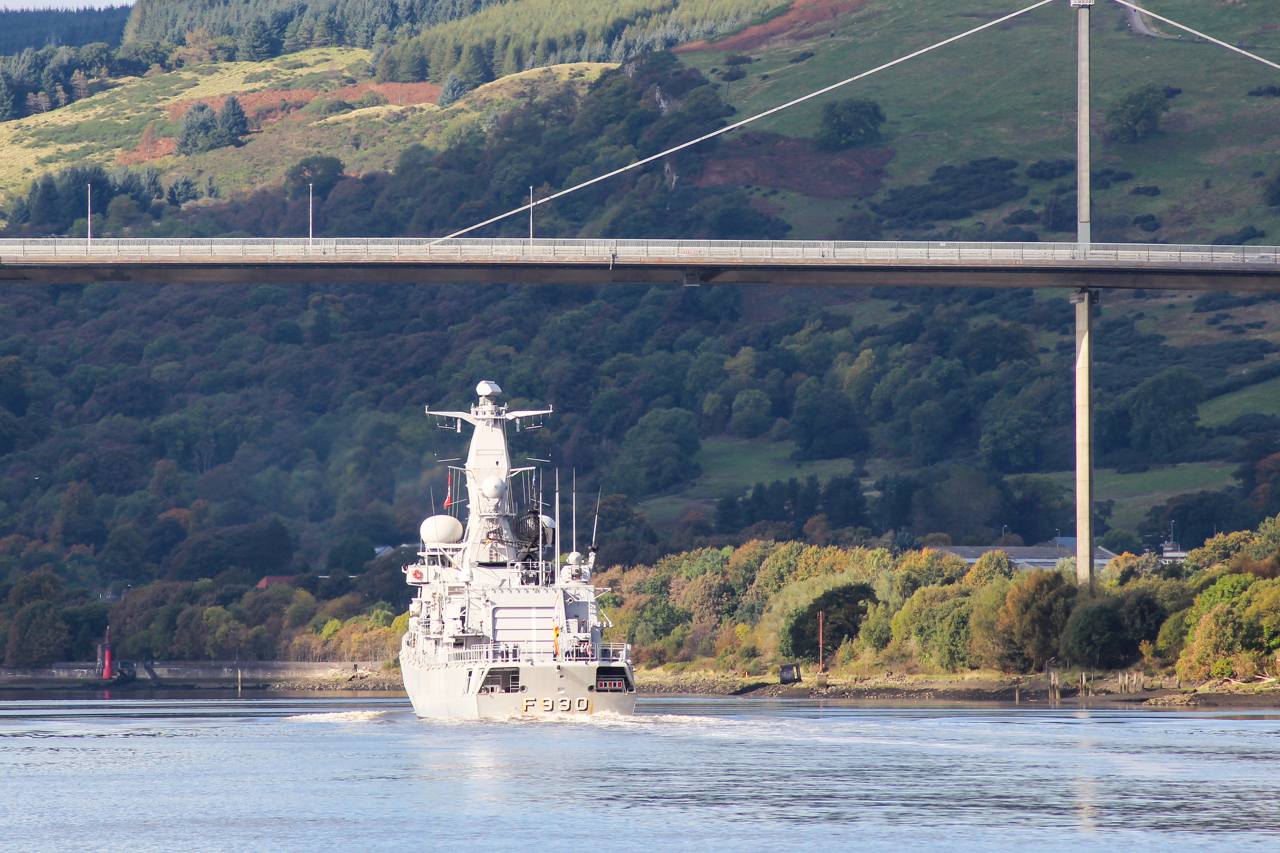
Belgian frigate Leopold I passing under the Erskine Bridge

The economic prosperity that the Clyde made possible at the beginning of the Industrial Revolution was due to the location of Glasgow, as a port facing the Americas. Tobacco and cotton trade began to drive this economic engine in the early 18th century. However, an obstacle to further economic growth soon became evident: the Clyde was too shallow for the largest ocean-going ships to navigate into it, so cargo had to be transferred, at Greenock or Port Glasgow, to smaller ships that could sail upstream into Glasgow itself.

=== Deepening the Upper Clyde ===
In 1768, John Golborne advised that the river should be made narrower and the scour increased by constructing rubble jetties and dredging sandbanks and shoals. Another obstacle to navigation that had to be solved was that the river divided into two shallow channels by the Dumbuck shoal near Dumbarton. After James Watt's 1769 report describing this problem, a jetty was constructed at Longhaugh Point to block off the southern channel. This turned out to be insufficient to solve the problem, so in 1773, a training wall called the Lang Dyke was built on the Dumbuck shoal to stop water flowing over into the southern channel of the river.

In the late 18th and early 19th centuries, hundreds of jetties were built out from the banks of the river between Dumbuck and the Broomielaw quay in Glasgow proper. In some cases, this construction had the effect of deepening the river, because the increased flow of the newly constrained water wore away the river bottom. In other cases, dredging was required to deepen the river.

In the mid-19th century, engineers took on the task of dredging the Clyde much more extensively. They removed millions of cubic feet of silt to deepen and widen the channel. The major stumbling block encountered by that project was a massive geological intrusion known as Elderslie Rock. Because that rock increased the project's difficulty, the work was not completed until the 1880s. Around this time, the Clyde became an important source of inspiration for artists, such as John Atkinson Grimshaw and James Kay, who were interested in painting scenes that depicted the new industrial era and the modern world.

=== Shipbuilding and marine engineering ===
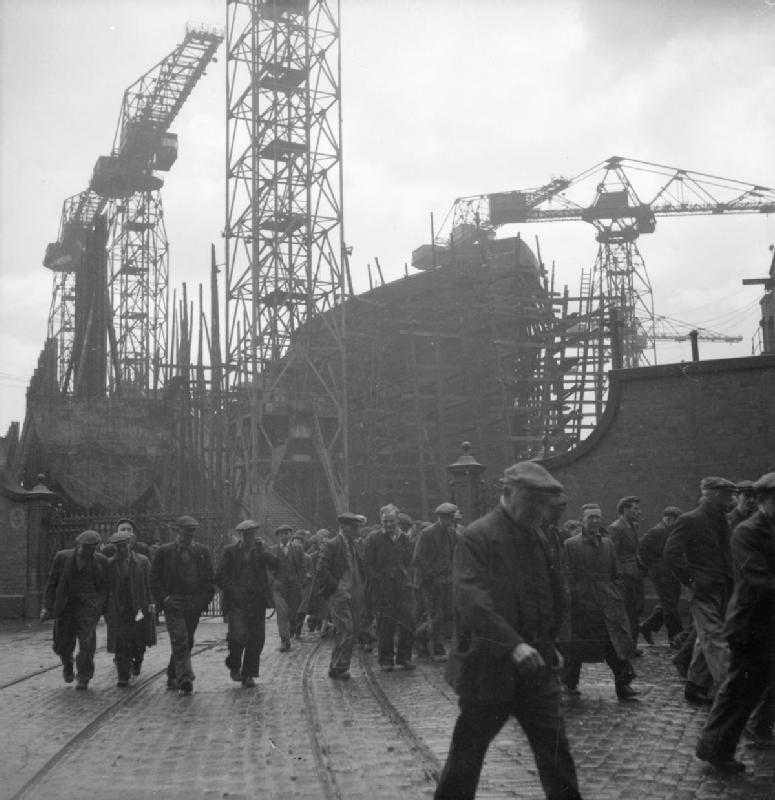
A Glasgow shipyard in 1944

The completion of the dredging was well-timed, because the channel finally became navigable all the way from Greenock to Glasgow just when the steelwork industry had begun to grow in the city. Shipbuilding replaced trade as the major activity on the river, and shipbuilding companies started rapidly establishing themselves there. The Clyde soon gained a reputation for being the best location for shipbuilding in the British Empire, and grew to become the world's pre-eminent shipbuilding centre. The term Clydebuilt became an industry symbol of high quality, and the river's shipyards were given contracts to build prestigious ocean-going liners, as well as warships. The Queen Mary and, in later years, the Queen Elizabeth 2 were built in the town of Clydebank.

Between 1712, when the Scott family's shipyard was built at Greenock, and the present day, over 25,000 ships have been built on the River Clyde, its firth, and its tributaries, the River Kelvin and the River Cart, by many boatyards, including those at Maryhill and Kirkintilloch on the Forth & Clyde Canal, and Blackhill on the Monkland Canal. Over the same time period, it is estimated that more than 300 firms have engaged in shipbuilding on Clydeside, although probably at most 30 to 40 firms were operating at any given time.

The shipbuilding firms became household names on Clydeside, and even around the world to some extent. These included, among many others, John Brown & Company of Clydebank, Denny of Dumbarton, Scott of Greenock, Lithgows of Port Glasgow, Simon and Lobnitz of Renfrew, Alexander Stephen & Sons of Linthouse, Fairfield of Govan, Inglis of Pointhouse, Barclay Curle of Whiteinch, Connell and Yarrow of Scotstoun. Almost as famous were the engineering firms that supplied the machinery needed to drive these vessels, including the boilers, pumps, and steering gear, including Rankin & Blackmore, Hastie's and Kincaid's of Greenock, Rowan's of Finnieston, Weir's of Cathcart, Howden's of Tradeston, and Babcock & Wilcox of Renfrew.

One shipyard that was known as a 'Clyde' shipyard was not actually located on any of the Clyde's waterways: Alley & MacLellan's Sentinel Works in Jessie Street at Polmadie is around half a mile distant from the Clyde. It is said to have constructed over 500 vessels, many of which were assembled and then 'knocked down' to kit form for despatch to a remote location, such as Chauncy Maples. Clyde shipbuilding reached its peak in the years just before World War I: It is estimated that, in the year 1913 alone, over 370 ships were completed.

== Yachting and yachtbuilding ==
The first recorded Clyde racing yacht, a 46-ton cutter, was built by Scotts of Greenock in 1803. The pre-eminent Scottish yacht designer William Fyfe did not start designing yachts until 1807. The first yacht club on the Clyde was the Northern Yacht Club, which was established in 1824 and received its royal charter in 1831. The club was founded to organise and encourage the sport of yacht racing. By 1825, Scottish and Irish clubs were racing against each other on the Clyde. By the mid-19th century, yachting and yacht building had become widely popular.

The Clyde became famous worldwide for its significant contribution to yachting and yachtbuilding, and was the home of many notable designers: William Fife III, Alfred Mylne, G. L. Watson, E. McGruer, and David Boyd. It was also home to many famous yacht yards.

Robertson's Yard started repairing boats in a small workshop at Sandbank in 1876, and went on to become one of the foremost wooden boat builders on the Clyde. The 'golden years' of Robertson's yard were in the early 20th century, when they started building classic 12-and-15-metre (39 and 49 ft) racing yachts. More than 55 boats were built by Robertson's in preparation for World War I, and the yard remained busy even during the Great Depression in the 1930s, as many wealthy businessmen developed a passion for yacht racing on the Clyde. During World War II, the yard was devoted to Admiralty work, producing large, high-speed Fairmile Marine motor boats (motor torpedo boats and motor gun boats). After the war, the yard built the successful one-class Loch Longs and two 12 m (39 ft) challengers for the America's Cup, designed by David Boyd: Sceptre (1958) and Sovereign (1964). Because of difficult business conditions in 1965, the yard turned to doing GRP production work (mainly building Pipers and Etchells), and it closed in 1980. During its 104-year history, Robertson's Yard built 500 boats, many of which are still sailing today.

Two other notable boatyards on the Clyde were Silvers, which operated from 1910 to 1970, and McGruers, which operated from 1910 to 1973. They were situated on the Rosneath peninsula on the banks of the Gare Loch, within half a mile of each other. McGruers built over 700 boats. Both yards built many widely-known and classic yachts, some of which are still sailing today.

== Glasgow Humane Society ==
The Glasgow Humane Society is responsible for the safety and preservation of life on Glasgow's waterways. Founded in 1790, it is the oldest lifesaving organisation in the world.

== Shipbuilding decline ==
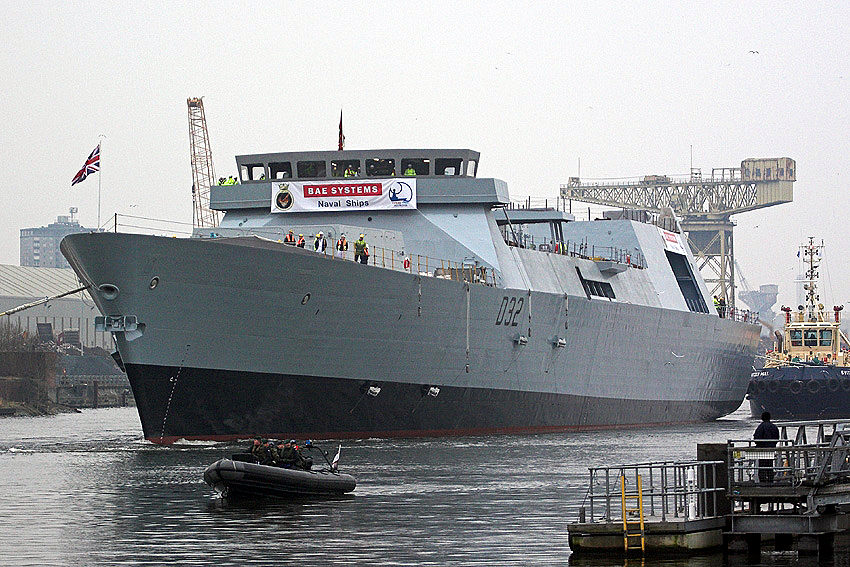
Although diminished from its early 20th-century heights, shipbuilding remains an important industry on Clydeside. Shown is HMS Daring after launching

During and immediately after World War II, the Clyde's importance as a major industrial centre rapidly declined. During the war, the Luftwaffe singled out Clydebank for bombing, and its buildings sustained heavy damage. In the immediate postwar period, the sharp reduction in warship orders was initially balanced by a prolonged boom in merchant shipbuilding. But by the end of the 1950s, other countries had begun to establish well-capitalised and highly productive shipbuilding centres that were able to outcompete many of the European shipbuilding yards. Several Clydeside yards booked a series of loss-making contracts in the hope of weathering the storm, but their unprofitable circumstances continued for too long, and by the mid-1960s they faced potential collapse. Harland and Wolff's Linthouse yard went under, and Fairfields of Govan faced bankruptcy. The government tried to limit the decline by creating the Upper Clyde Shipbuilders consortium, but the consortium became mired in controversy and collapsed in 1971. After that, James Callaghan's Labour government implemented the Aircraft and Shipbuilding Industries Act 1977 (c. 3), which nationalised most of the Clyde's shipyards and grouped them with other major British shipyards, such as the firm British Shipbuilders.

Today, two major shipyards on the Upper Clyde remain in operation. They are both owned by a naval defence contractor, BAE Systems Surface Ships, which specialises in the design and construction of technologically advanced warships for the Royal Navy and other navies around the world. The two yards are the former Yarrow yard at Scotstoun, and Fairfields at Govan. In addition, the King George V Dock is operated by the Clyde Port Authority. Ferguson Shipbuilders, at Port Glasgow on the Lower Clyde, is now owned by the Scottish government. It is the last survivor of the many shipyards that once dominated Port Glasgow and Greenock. Its core business is now the construction of car ferries.

== Regeneration ==
Major regeneration schemes include those in the 1970s of forming Strathclyde Country Park, lying between Hamilton and Motherwell, as part of motorway developments; the establishment of the Glasgow Garden Festival 1988 as part of the re-use of city docklands and associated industrial uses led by the Scottish Development Agency in the 1980s and early 90s. The Clyde Waterfront Regeneration project from 2008 aims to continue this approach of finding new uses and attracting new investment, from Glasgow Green to Dumbarton. Residents and tourists come back to the riverside, especially in Glasgow, where vast former docklands have given way to housing and amenities on the banks in the city. Examples of public amenities and attractions include the Scottish Exhibition and Conference Centre, the Glasgow Science Centre, and the Riverside Museum. Merchant shipping has largely moved west, closer to deeper water at Greenock, and 20 miles beyond that, south, to Hunterston. The river's water is increasingly used for recreation now that industrial uses have diminished.

The Clyde Walkway, originating at Glasgow's Custom House Quay in the 1970s, and completed eastward in 2005, is a foot-and mountain-bike path that follows the course of the Clyde between Glasgow and New Lanark. Scottish Natural Heritage has designated it one of Scotland's Great Trails.

== Pollution ==
The British Geological Survey has identified and evaluated organic chemical pollutants in the sediment of the Clyde estuary. Surface sediments from the Glasgow reaches of the Clyde and Cuningar to Milton, were previously found to contain polyaromatic hydrocarbons (PAH) from 630 μg/kg to 23,711 μg/kg and polychlorinated biphenyl (PCB) in the range of 5 to 130.5 μg/kg, which puts these sediments in the range classified as "non-toxic." However, a later study showed PCB concentrations as high as 5,797 μg/kg, which is above published threshold levels for such chlorinated compounds. A comparison between individual PAH compounds that have different thermal stabilities shows that the source of PAH pollution in the Clyde is different in different parts of the river. PAH in the inner Clyde (Cuningar to Milton) are from combustion sources (vehicle exhaust, coal burning), whereas PAH in the outer Clyde are from petroleum spills.

The amount and type of sedimentary pollution in the Clyde reflects the area's industrial history. In order to assess how the nature of the pollutants has changed over time, from 1750 to 2002, seven sediment cores of one metre's depth were collected, and dated using lead concentrations and changing lead isotope ratios. The sediments showed a long but declining history of coal usage and, beginning around the 1950s, an increasing reliance on petroleum fuels. The decline of hydrocarbon pollution was followed by the appearance of PCB concentrations in the 1950s. Total PCB concentration levels peaked in the period 1965 to 1977, and declined beginning in the 1990s. The Polmadie Burn, which flows into the Clyde at Richmond Park, remains heavily contaminated by hexavalent chromium, to the extent it turned bright green in 2019, and yellow in 2021.

Although pollution from heavy industry and power generation has been decreasing, there is evidence that human-made pollution from new synthetic compounds in electrical products and textiles has been increasing. The amounts of 16 polybrominated diphenyl ether (PBDE) compounds used as flame retardants in televisions, computers, and furniture upholstery were measured in sediment cores collected from six sites between Princes Dock and Greenock. Comparison of the amounts of PBDE compounds revealed a decline in certain compounds, in line with the European ban on production of mixtures containing environmentally harmful PBDE with eight and nine bromine atoms. At the same time, there was an increase in the amounts of the less harmful mixture, composed of ten bromine atoms.

== Heat pumps ==
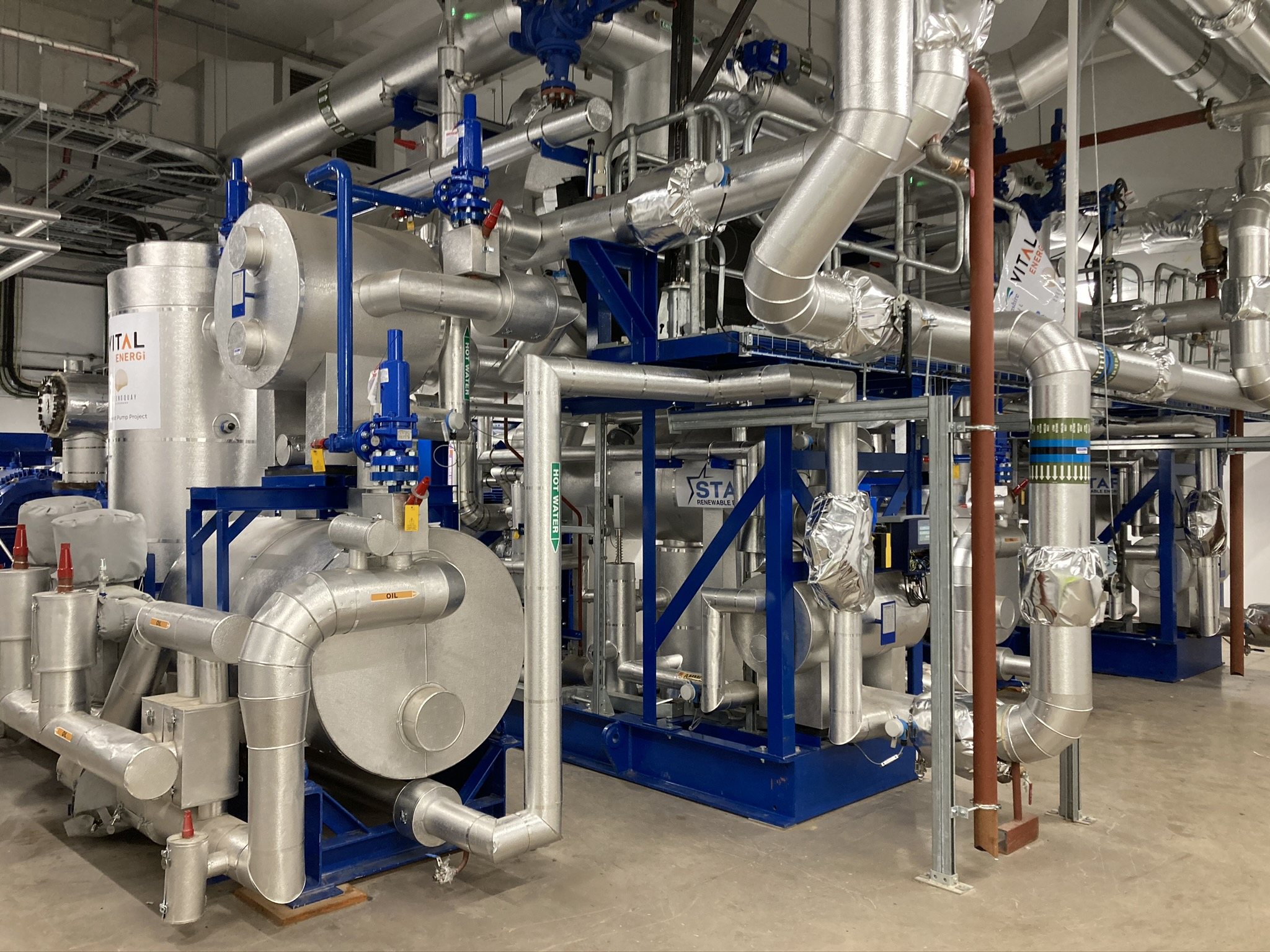
Heat Pump-QQ

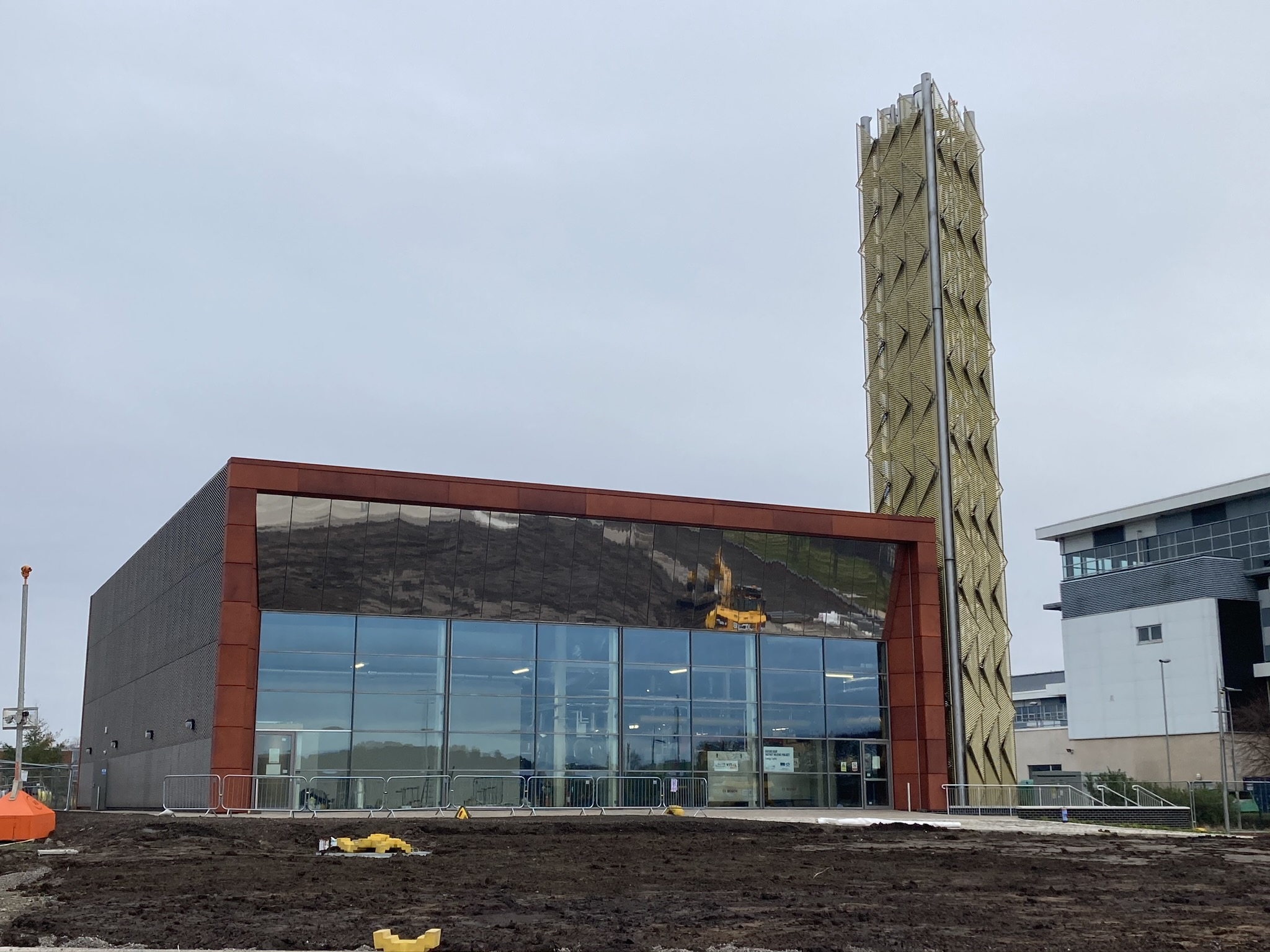
Energy Centre

The River Clyde, or more accurately the Clyde Estuary, has significant potential as a heat source. The flow rate downstream alone is around 50 m^{3}/s.

In 2020, West Dunbartonshire Council deployed a river source heat pump scheme in the area called Queens Quay. It is the first large heat pump scheme in Britain to deliver at 80 °C. The heat pumps were supplied by Star Refrigeration Ltd, who manufactured them in their Glasgow factory. The project was delivered by Vital Energi.

== See also ==
- List of crossings of the River Clyde
- Bodinbo Island
- Bonnington Pavilion
- HMNB Clyde
- Red Clydeside
- Rivers of Great Britain
- Donald's Quay
