= Alexander McKenzie (chemist) =

Scottish chemist

Alexander McKenzie FRS
- Born: 6 December 1869; Dundee, Scotland
- Died: 11 June 1951 (aged 81)
- Education: High School of Dundee, University of St Andrews, University of Berlin
- Occupation: chemist
- Known for: specializing in stereochemistry
- Notable work: author or co-author of over 100 research papers

Alexander McKenzie FRS (6 December 1869, Dundee – 11 June 1951) was a Scottish chemist, specializing in stereochemistry. Kinetic resolution by synthetic means was first reported in 1899 by Marckwald and McKenzie.

== Life ==
After education at the High School of Dundee from 1882 to 1885, McKenzie matriculated in 1885 at the University of St Andrews, where he studied Chemistry under Prof Thomas Purdie FRS and graduated in 1889 with M.A. in 1889 and in 1891 with the research degree B.Sc. in chemistry. At St Andrews, he was from 1891 to 1893 a lecture assistant to Thomas Purdie, from 1893 to 1896 a "university assistant" engaged in teaching, and from 1896 to 1898 a research assistant to Purdie in stereochemistry and optical activity. In 1898 McKenzie went to the University of Berlin to work under Landolt and received there in 1899 his D.Sc. He left Berlin in 1901 after receiving his Ph.D. under the supervision of Marckwald and went to London's Jenner Institute, where he stayed until 1902. At Birbeck College, London, McKenzie was from 1902 to 1905 an assistant lecturer and demonstrator and from 1905 to 1914 head of the chemistry department. At University College, Dundee, he held the chair of chemistry from 1914 until his retirement in 1938.

McKenzie was the author or co-author of over 100 research papers. He was elected F.R.S. in 1916. Much of his research in the early part of his career deal with asymmetric synthesis.

He has maintained his original interest in the fundamental problems of asymmetric synthesis, and his name will always be associated with elegant work on these problems, as well as on the Walden inversion, and on the migration of organic radicals. His isolation (with Wren in 1908) of optically active benzoin may be cited as a particularly delicate stereochemical achievement, typical of his work in general. McKenzie is also known as a master in the application of the Grignard reagent and a pioneer in the vast field which was opened up by the addition of this invaluable new weapon to the armoury of organic chemistry.

== Selected publications ==
- with Henry Wren: McKenzie, Alex; Wren, Henry (1908). "XXIX.—The preparation of l-benzoin". Journal of the Chemical Society, Transactions. 93: 309–314. doi:10.1039/ct9089300309.
- with H. Wren: McKenzie, Alex.; Wren, Henry (1910). "LII.—Optically active glycols derived from l-benzoin and from methyl l-mandelate". Journal of the Chemical Society, Transactions. 97: 473–486. doi:10.1039/ct9109700473.
