= Elderslie Rock =

Elderslie Rock is a geological intrusion of hard whinstone rock which extends across and beneath the River Clyde near Glasgow, Scotland. It represented a significant hazard to shipping until large sections were blasted to an eventual depth of 28 feet in the nineteenth and early twentieth centuries, at a high cost and using then-innovative techniques.

== Historical context ==
In its natural state some sections of the River Clyde below Glasgow were as little as fourteen inches deep at low tide. From 1755 on, efforts were made to artificially deepen the Clyde to permit the passage of larger ships, and by 1772 a low-tide depth of five feet had been cleared through the building of jetties to increase the scour rate of the river. Over several decades improvements continued, with dredgers deepening and widening the river to a depth of seventeen feet by 1840.

In 1854, the steamship Glasgow approached her namesake city from New York City. The ship had the maximum draught that was considered safe for the river at that time. The Glasgow ran aground and was holed in the river approximately at Renfrew. Since the existence of Elderslie Rock was then unknown, it was initially supposed that a large boulder had been to blame, but test borings indicated that the obstruction was much larger.

== Geology ==
The section of the rock under the Clyde runs diagonally beneath the river and continues under its banks. It is 900 feet long and 300 feet wide. A contemporary account describes it as a geological dyke where the "true dyke had overflown and spread over a bed of shale, considerably altering the character of both the rock and the shale."

The rock is described as being composed of whinstone, a generic term used to refer to dark-coloured hard rocks.

In its natural state, the rock was eight feet below the low-tide level of the river.

== Blasting ==
In 1850 it was decided to use underwater explosives to cut a narrow channel in the northern half of the river to a depth of fourteen feet. This work lasted for seven years and cost £14,000 - the equivalent of £800,000 in 2005.

A more substantial project began in 1880, with the intention of blasting and clearing the rock to a depth of twenty feet across much of the width of the river. This work was completed in 1886, having cost £70,000 (equivalent to £3.2 million in 2005). Completing this task required the development of innovative engineering techniques for mechanized diamond drilling underwater without the assistance of divers, and experimentation with a range of explosives. The work attracted international attention. In all 15,000 blasting holes were drilled and 90,000 pounds of explosives consumed. 110,000 tons of rock was removed, some of which was used in building river walls for further improvement of the Clyde.

Subsequent smaller excavations further widened and deepened the river at this location, until it was made safe for vessels with a draught of up to 28 feet across 320 feet of width from 1903 to 1907.
