= Biggar High School =

Location
- Market Road; Biggar, South Lanarkshire; Scotland; 55°37′22″N 3°31′22″W

Information
- Type: Secondary
- Motto: Declaret Factum (Declare It)
- Headteacher: Geraldine Sim
- Staff: 80
- Enrolment: 723 as of September 2015
- Colours: Black, white, blue
- Mascot: Ram's head, as viewed from side on
- Website: http://www.biggar.s-lanark.sch.uk

Biggar High School (local education authority: South Lanarkshire) is a secondary school located in the town of Biggar, South Lanarkshire.

== About ==
It is a mixed secondary school of non-denominational religion.

The schools Headteacher is Geraldine Sim. The school’s Deputy Head Teachers are Craig Robertson (Primary Transitions, S1 & S2), Graham Lang (S3 & S4), Denise McFarlane (Senior Phase, Mon-Wed & Fri) and Lorraine Leiper (Senior Phase, Thurs).

There are three school houses; Anderson, Burns and Stewart (formally Wallace, renamed after previous head teacher Robert Stewart, after his retirement in June 2025).

The schools Captaincy quartet of 2026/27 is made up of Captains, Beth Bailie and Sophie Mellanby, and Vice Captains, Vince Laing and George Thomson.

== Awards and recognition ==
In June 2007, Biggar High School won the Most Enterprising School in Scotland award.

Biggar High School won the silver medal at the British Schools Orienteering Championships at Druridge Bay Country Park, Northumberland, England, where three pupils, along with their coach, ran 4 kilometres (2.5 mi) over sand dunes as high as 25 metres (82 ft).

== Notable pupils ==
- Susan Aitken, Scottish politician
- Margaret Ewing, politician and journalist
- Emily Nicholl, Scotland netball international
