= Biggar Corn Exchange =

Commercial building in Biggar, South Lanarkshire, Scotland

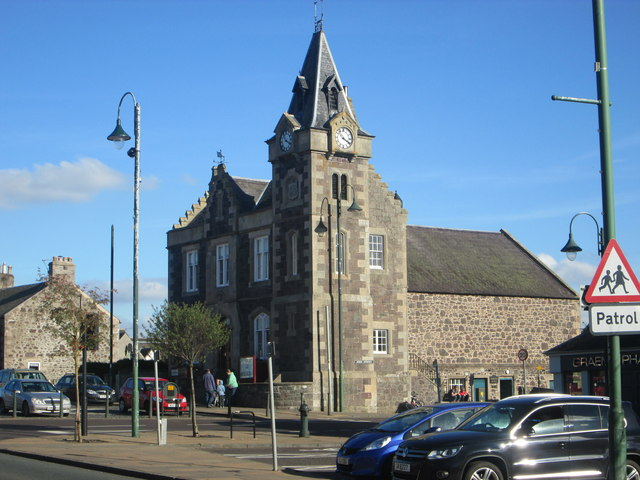
- Biggar Corn Exchange

- Shown in South Lanarkshire
- 55.6244°N 3.5217°W
- Location: High Street, Biggar

History
- Built: 1861

Site notes
- Architect: David MacGibbon
- Architectural style: Scottish baronial style

Listed Building – Category B
- Official name: Biggar Corn Exchange, High Street
- Designated: 7 May 1980
- Reference no.: LB22240

Biggar Corn Exchange is a commercial building in the High Street, Biggar, South Lanarkshire, Scotland. The structure, which is now used as a theatre, is a Category B listed building.

== History ==
In medieval times, there was a stone cross in the High Street, known as the Cross Knowe, which dated from the mid-15th century. Behind the Cross Knowe was a market house known as the Meal House at which corn merchants conducted their trade. However, by the mid-19th century, the Meal House was infested with rats and mice. The burgh leaders decided to acquire it from the then-owner, Colonel John Elphinstone-Fleming (later the 14th Lord Elphinstone), to demolish it and to commission a new building on the same site.

The foundation stone for the new building was laid by the Grand Master of the Upper Ward of Clydesdale, William Edward Hope-Vere, with full masonic honours on 24 August 1860. It was designed by David MacGibbon in the Scottish baronial style, built by the firm of Jack & White of Edinburgh in rubble masonry with ashlar stone dressings, and was officially opened by the local member of parliament, Sir Edward Colebrooke, 4th Baronet, on 14 November 1861. The design involved an asymmetrical main frontage of four bays facing onto the High Street. The first three bays formed the main block and, to the right of the main block, there was a four-stage clock tower. The central bay of the main block, which was clad in ashlar stone and was slightly projected forward, featured a doorway with an ogee-shaped hood mould on the ground floor, a cross-window on the first floor and a lancet window in the stepped gable above. The other bays in the main block were fenestrated with arched windows on the ground floor and cross-windows on the first floor. The clock tower contained lancet windows in the first two stages, a coat of arms in the third stage and a clock face in the fourth stage, all surmounted by a pyramid-shaped roof ventilated by louvres. Elements of the Cross Knowe were recovered and installed just above the oculus in the south gable of the corn exchange. Internally the principal room was the main hall, but there were also reading and meeting rooms on the first floor.

The use of the building as a corn exchange declined significantly in the wake of the Great Depression of British Agriculture in the late 19th century. Instead, it started showing silent films and, by 1913, it was operating as a cinema. It was acquired by Biggar Burgh Council in 1935 and became known as Biggar Cinema. It closed as a cinema in 1965 and then became a local theatre workshop.

A major programme of refurbishment works costing £500,000, were financed by South Lanarkshire Council, the Heritage Lottery Fund, the Town Centre Regeneration Fund and the Leader Scheme and undertaken to a design by Richard Murphy Architects in 2010. After the works were completed, the building re-opened as a community arts centre in October 2010.

== See also ==
- List of listed buildings in Biggar, South Lanarkshire
