= Oxocarbon anion =

Negatively-charged molecule made of carbon and oxygen

2D diagram of mellitate C_{12}O^{6−}_{12}, one of the oxocarbon anions. Black circles are carbon atoms, red circles are oxygen atoms. Each blue halo represents one half of a negative charge.

In chemistry, an oxocarbon anion is a negative ion consisting solely of carbon and oxygen atoms, and therefore having the general formula C_{x}O^{n−}_{y} for some integers x, y, and n.

The most common oxocarbon anions are carbonate, CO^{2−}_{3}, and oxalate, C_{2}O^{2−}_{4}. There are, however, a large number of stable anions in this class, including several that have research or industrial use. There are also many unstable anions, like CO^{−}_{2} and CO^{4−}, that have a fleeting existence during some chemical reactions, and many hypothetical species, like CO^{4−}_{4}, that have been the subject of theoretical studies but have yet to be observed.

Stable oxocarbon anions form salts with a large variety of cations. Unstable anions may persist in very rarefied gaseous state, such as in interstellar clouds. Most oxocarbon anions have corresponding moieties in organic chemistry, whose compounds are usually esters. Thus, for example, the oxalate moiety [−O−(C=O)_{2}−O−] occurs in the ester dimethyl oxalate H_{3}C−O−(C=O)_{2}−O−CH_{3}.

== Electronic structure of the carbonate ion ==
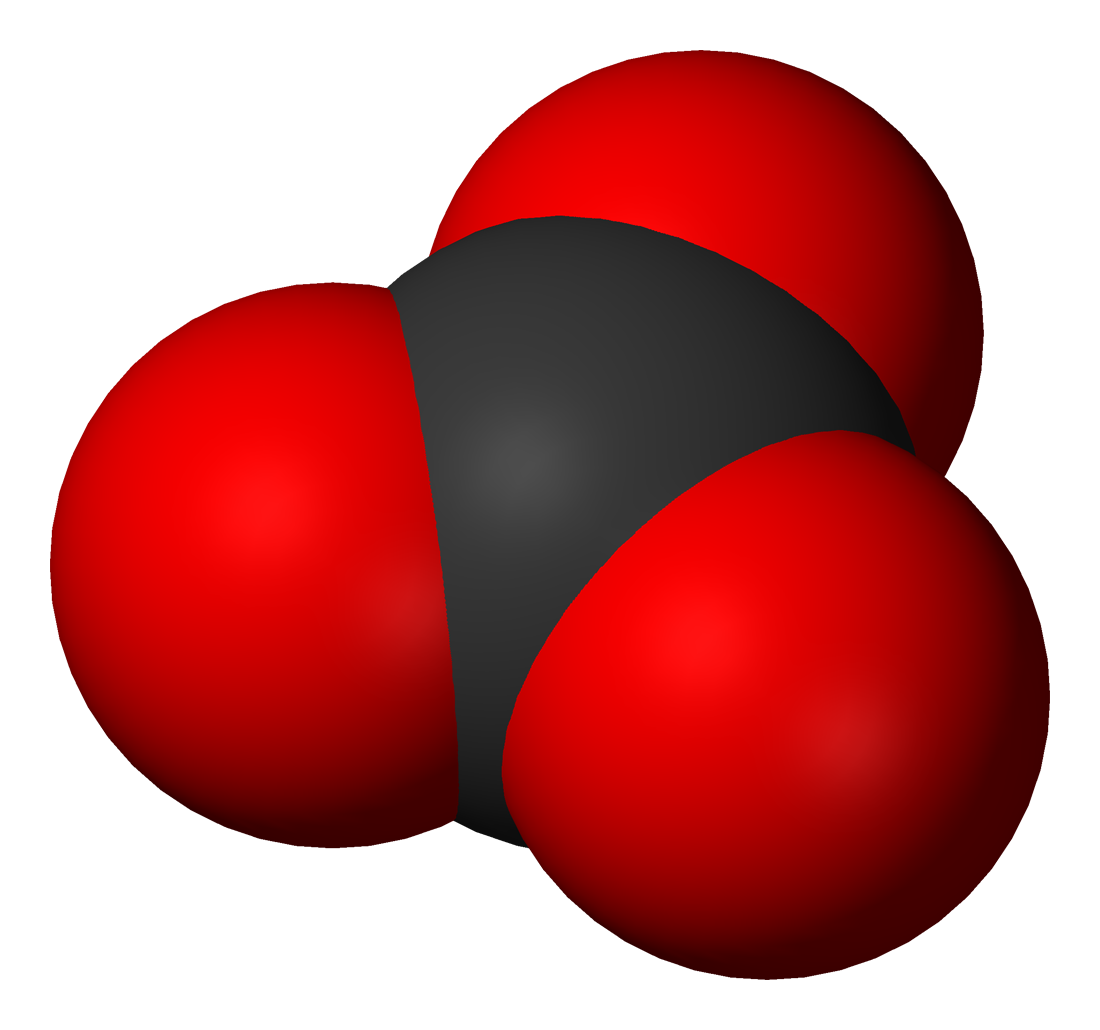
Space-filling model of the carbonate ion

The carbonate ion has a trigonal planar structure, point group D_{3h}. The three C–O bonds have the same length of 136 pm and the 3 O–C–O angles are 120°. The carbon atom has 4 pairs of valence electrons, which shows that the molecule obeys the octet rule. This is one factor that contributes to the high stability of the ion, which occurs in rocks such as limestone. The electronic structure is described by two main theories which are used to show how the 4 electron pairs are distributed in a molecule that only has 3 C–O bonds.

With valence bond theory, the electronic structure of the carbonate ion is a resonance hybrid of 3 canonical forms:

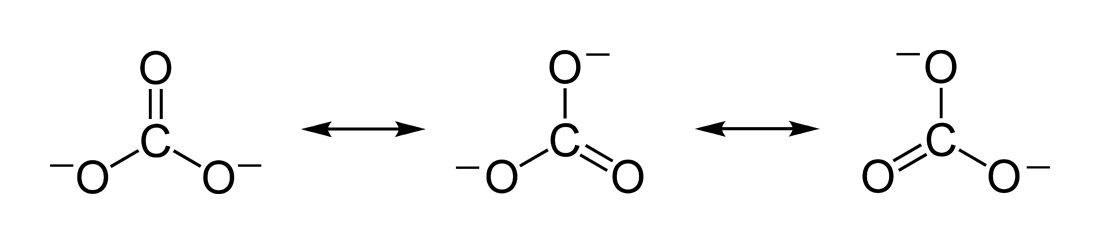
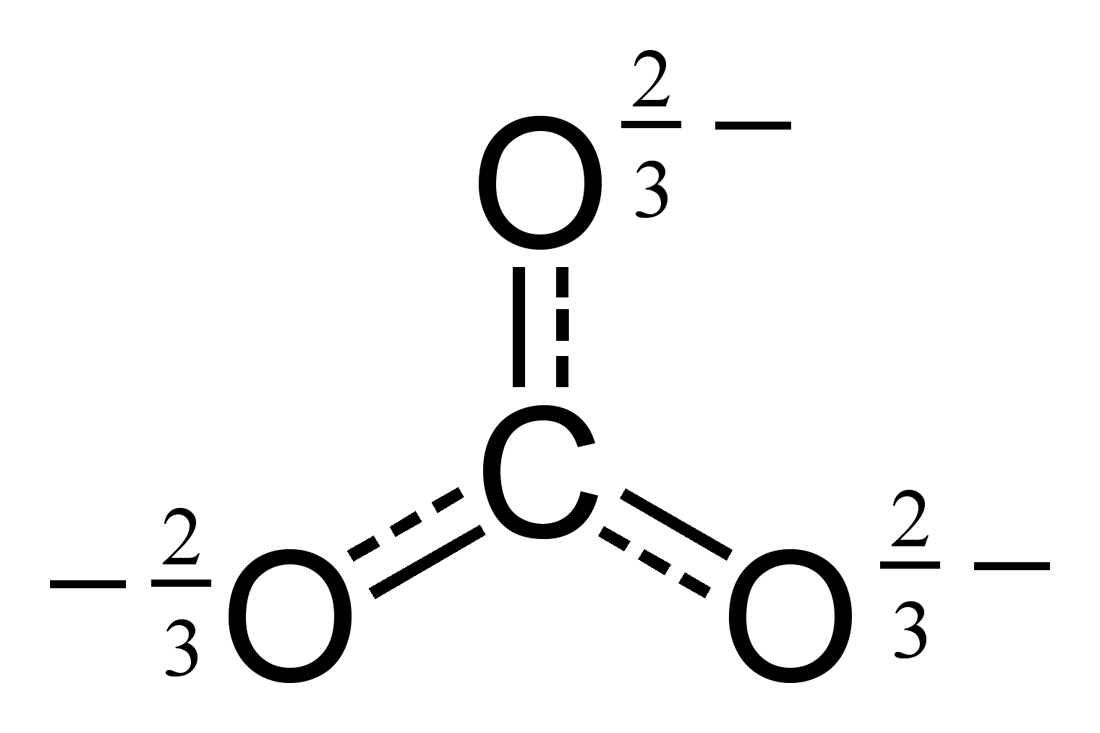

In each canonical form there are two single bonds and one double bond. The three canonical forms contribute equally to the resonance hybrid, so the three C–O bonds have the same length.

Making a π-bond between 2 atoms of the same chemical element

With molecular orbital theory, the 3-fold axis is designated as the z-axis of the molecule. Three σ bonds are formed by the overlap of the s, p_{x}, and p_{y} orbitals on the carbon atom with a p orbital on each oxygen atom. In addition, a delocalized π bond is made by overlap of the p_{z} orbital on the carbon atom with the p_{z} orbital on each oxygen atom which is perpendicular to the plane of the molecule.

The same bonding schemes may be applied the nitrate ion, NO^{−}_{3}, which is isoelectronic with the carbonate ion.

Similarly, the two-fold symmetrical structure of a carboxylate group, CO^{−}_{2}, may be described as a resonance hybrid of two canonical forms in valence bond theory, or with 2 σ bonds and a delocalized π bond in molecular orbital theory.

== Related compounds ==
=== Oxocarbon acids ===
An oxocarbon anion C_{x}O^{n−}_{y} can be seen as the result of removing all protons from a corresponding acid C_{x}H_{n}O_{y}. Carbonate CO^{2−}_{3}, for example, can be seen as the anion of carbonic acid H_{2}CO_{3}. Sometimes the "acid" is actually an alcohol or other species; this is the case, for example, of acetylenediolate C_{2}O^{2−}_{2} that would yield acetylenediol C_{2}H_{2}O_{2}. However, the anion is often more stable than the acid (as is the case for carbonate), and sometimes the acid is unknown or is expected to be extremely unstable (as is the case of methanetetracarboxylate C(COO^{−})_{4}).

=== Neutralized species ===
Every oxocarbon anion C_{x}O^{n−}_{y} can be matched in principle to the electrically neutral (or oxidized) variant C_{x}O_{y}, an oxocarbon (oxide of carbon) with the same composition and structure except for the negative charge. As a rule, however, these neutral oxocarbons are less stable than the corresponding anions. Thus, for example, the stable carbonate anion corresponds to the extremely unstable neutral carbon trioxide CO_{3}; oxalate C_{2}O^{2−}_{4} corresponds to the even-less-stable 1,2-dioxetanedione C_{2}O_{4}; and the stable croconate anion C_{5}O^{2−}_{5} corresponds to the neutral cyclopentanepentone C_{5}O_{5} (once called leuconic acid), which has been detected only in trace amounts.

=== Reduced variants ===
Conversely, some oxocarbon anions can be reduced to yield other anions with the same structural formula but greater negative charge. Thus rhodizonate C_{6}O^{2−}_{6} can be reduced to the tetrahydroxybenzoquinone (THBQ) anion C_{6}O^{4−}_{6} and then to benzenehexolate C_{6}O^{6−}_{6}. In this specific case, there exists a stable radical anion C_{6}O^{3−}_{6} which is formed by simultaneous oxidation of C_{6}O^{4−}_{6} and reduction of C_{6}O^{2−}_{6} in an electrolytic cell.

=== Acid anhydrides ===
An oxocarbon anion C_{x}O^{n−}_{y} can sometimes be associated with the anhydride of the corresponding acid. The latter would be an oxocarbon with formula C_{x}O_{y−n/2} ; namely, the acid minus n/2 water molecules H_{2}O. The standard example is the connection between carbonate CO^{2−}_{3} and carbon dioxide CO_{2}. The correspondence is not always well-defined, since there may be several ways of performing this formal dehydration, including joining two or more anions to make an oligomer or polymer. Unlike neutralization, this formal dehydration sometimes yields fairly stable oxocarbons, such as mellitic anhydride C_{12}O_{9} from mellitate C_{12}O^{6−}_{12} via mellitic acid C_{12}H_{6}O_{12}, or benzoquinonetetracarboxylic dianhydride C_{10}O_{8} from the corresponding acid C_{10}H_{4}O_{10} and anion C_{10}O^{4−}_{10}.

A notable exception to the general stability of these anhydrides is dioxalic anhydride or dioxane tetraketone (C_{4}O_{6}), which decomposes above 0 °C, although the oxalate anion C_{2}O^{2−}_{4} is ubiquitous. The highly unstable carbonite anion has no directly associated acid (formic acid H(CO)OH is an isomer of the hypothetical carbonous acid C(OH)_{2}) and thus cannot be associated with its "anhydride" carbon monoxide, which does not act as a practical precursor to any oxocarbonic acid.

=== Hydrogenated anions ===
For each oxocarbon anion C_{x}O^{n−}_{y} there are in principle n−1 partially hydrogenated anions with formulas H_{k}C_{x}O^{(n−k)−}_{y}, where k ranges from 1 to n−1. These anions are generally indicated by the prefixes "hydrogen-", "dihydrogen-", "trihydrogen-", etc. Some of them, however, have special names: hydrogencarbonate HCO^{−}_{3} is commonly called bicarbonate, and hydrogenoxalate HC_{2}O^{−}_{4} is known as binoxalate.

The hydrogenated anions may be stable even if the fully protonated acid is not (as is the case of bicarbonate).

== List of oxocarbon anions ==
Here is an incomplete list of the known or conjectured oxocarbon anions.

Diagram	Formula	Name	Acid	Anhydride	Neutralized
	:CO^{2−}_{2}	carbonite	C(OH)_{2} (carbonous acid)	CO	CO_{2}
	CO^{2−}_{3}	carbonate	CH_{2}O_{3}	CO_{2}	CO_{3}
	CO^{2−}_{4}	peroxocarbonate		CO_{3}	CO_{4}
	CO^{4−}_{4}	orthocarbonate	C(OH)_{4} (methanetetrol)	CO_{2}	CO_{4}
	C_{2}O^{2−}_{2}	acetylenediolate	C_{2}H_{2}O_{2} (acetylenediol)		C_{2}O_{2}
	C_{2}O^{2−}_{4}	oxalate	C_{2}H_{2}O_{4}	C_{2}O_{3}, C_{4}O_{6}	C_{2}O_{4}
	C_{2}O^{2−}_{5}	dicarbonate	C_{2}H_{2}O_{5}	C_{2}O_{4}	
	C_{2}O^{2−}_{6}	peroxodicarbonate			
	C_{3}O^{2−}_{3}	deltate	C_{3}O(OH)_{2}		C_{3}O_{3}
	C_{3}O^{2−}_{5}	mesoxalate	C_{3}H_{2}O_{5}		
	C_{4}O^{2−}_{4}	acetylenedicarboxylate	C_{4}H_{2}O_{4}		
	C_{4}O^{2−}_{4}	squarate	C_{4}O_{2}(OH)_{2}		C_{4}O_{4}
	C_{4}O^{2−}_{6}	dioxosuccinate	C_{4}H_{2}O_{6}		
	C_{5}O^{2−}_{5}	croconate	C_{5}O_{3}(OH)_{2}		C_{5}O_{5}
	C_{5}O^{4−}_{8}	methanetetracarboxylate	C_{5}H_{4}O_{8}		
	C_{6}O^{2−}_{6}	rhodizonate	C_{4}O_{4}(COH)_{2}		C_{6}O_{6}
	C_{6}O^{4−}_{6}	benzoquinonetetraolate; THBQ anion	(CO)_{2}(COH)_{4} TBHQ		C_{6}O_{6}
	C_{6}O^{6−}_{6}	benzenehexolate	C_{6}(OH)_{6} benzenehexol		C_{6}O_{6}
	C_{6}O^{4−}_{8}	ethylenetetracarboxylate	C_{6}H_{4}O_{8}	C_{6}O_{6}	
	C_{8}O^{4−}_{9}	furantetracarboxylate	C_{8}H_{4}O_{9}	C_{8}O_{7}	
	C_{10}O^{4−}_{10}	benzoquinonetetracarboxylate	C_{10}H_{4}O_{10}	C_{10}O_{8}	
	C_{12}O^{6−}_{12}	mellitate	C_{6}(COOH)_{6}	C_{12}O_{9}	

Several other oxocarbon anions have been detected in trace amounts, such as C_{6}O^{−}_{6}, a singly-ionized version of rhodizonate.

== See also ==
- Oxocarbon
- Silicate
- Sodium percarbonate (actually a carbonate perhydrate)
- Pseudo-oxocarbon anion
