= Furantetracarboxylic acid =

Names
- Preferred IUPAC name Furantetracarboxylic acid

Identifiers
CAS Number	20416-04-0
3D model (JSmol)	Interactive image
ChemSpider	207476
PubChem CID	237617
UNII	526V46EZC7
CompTox Dashboard (EPA)	DTXSID40285293
- InChI: InChI=1S/C8H4O9/c9-5(10)1-2(6(11)12)4(8(15)16)17-3(1)7(13)14/h(H,9,10)(H,11,12)(H,13,14)(H,15,16) Key: IREPGQRTQFRMQR-UHFFFAOYSA-N
- SMILES: C1(=C(OC(=C1C(=O)O)C(=O)O)C(=O)O)C(=O)O

Properties
Chemical formula	C_{8}H_{4}O_{9}
Molar mass	244.11 g/mol
- Except where otherwise noted, data are given for materials in their standard state (at 25 °C [77 °F], 100 kPa). verify (what is ?) Infobox references

In chemistry, furantetracarboxylic acid is an organic compound with formula C_{8}H_{4}O_{9}, or (C_{4}O)(-(CO)OH)_{4}, which can be viewed as deriving from furan C_{4}H_{4}O through replacement of the four hydrogen atoms by carboxyl functional groups -(CO)OH.

By removal of four protons, the acid is expected to yield the anion C_{8}O^{4−}_{9}, furantetracarboxylate, which is one of the oxocarbon anions (consisting solely of oxygen and carbon. By loss of 1 through 3 protons it forms the anions C_{8}H_{3}O^{−}_{9}, C_{8}H_{2}O^{2−}_{9}, and C_{8}HO^{3−}_{9}, called respectively trihydrogen-, dihydrogen-, and hydrogenfurantetracarboxylate. The same names are used for the corresponding esters.

The acid can be obtained by from dioxalylsuccinate.

The salt rubidium trihydrogenfurantetracarboxylate RbH_{3}C_{8}O_{9} crystallizes as white needles.

== See also ==
- Methanetetracarboxylic acid C_{5}H_{4}O_{8}
- Ethylenetetracarboxylic acid C_{6}H_{4}O_{8}
- Benzoquinonetetracarboxylic acid C_{10}H_{4}O_{10}
