= C6O6 =

The molecular formula C_{6}O_{6} (molar mass: 168.06 g/mol, exact mass: 167.9695 u) may refer to:

- Cyclohexanehexone, also known as hexaketocyclohexane or triquinoyl
- Ethylenetetracarboxylic dianhydride
