= Trioxoglutaric acid =

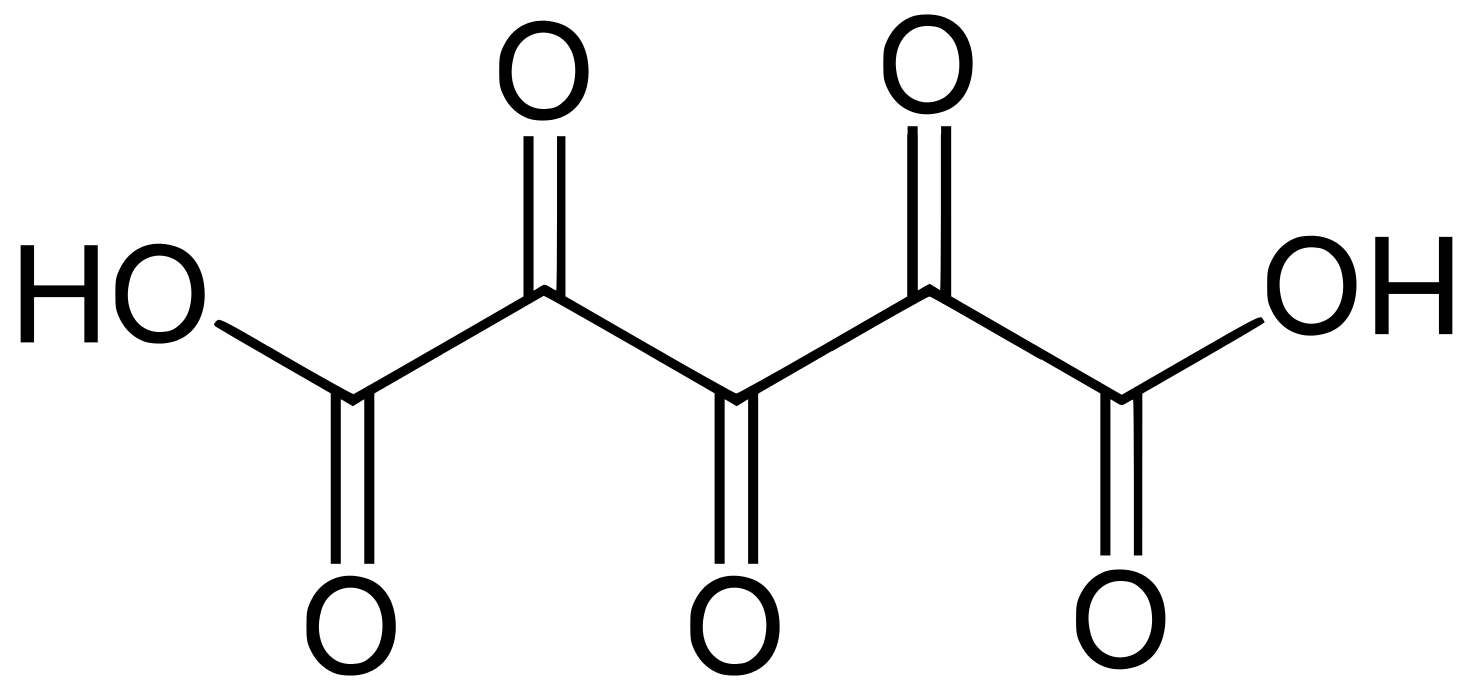
- Skeletal formula

Names
- Preferred IUPAC name Trioxopentanedioic acid
- Other names 2,3,4-Triioxoglutaric acid

Identifiers
| CAS Number | 18464-01-2 |
| 3D model (JSmol) | Interactive image |
| PubChem CID | 164519593 |
| CompTox Dashboard (EPA) | DTXSID501336493 |
- InChI: InChI=1S/C5H2O7/c6-1(2(7)4(9)10)3(8)5(11)12/h(H,9,10)(H,11,12) Key: PMUUJAYAGCHVLX-UHFFFAOYSA-N
- SMILES: OC(=O)C(=O)C(=O)C(=O)C(=O)O

Properties
| Chemical formula | C_{5}H_{2}O_{7} |
| Molar mass | 174.064 g·mol^{−1} |
- Except where otherwise noted, data are given for materials in their standard state (at 25 °C [77 °F], 100 kPa). Infobox references

Trioxoglutaric acid or trioxopentanedioic acid is a hypothetical chemical compound with formula C_{5}H_{2}O_{7} or HO−(C=O)_{5}−OH. It can be seen as a derivative of glutaric acid, hence its common name. It would be the next member of the series of fully oxidized straight-chain dicarboxylic acids, that starts with the oxalic, oxomalonic, and dioxosuccinic acids.

Removal of two protons from the molecule would yield the trioxoglutarate anion, C_{5}O^{2−}_{7} or ^{−}O−(C=O)_{5}−O^{−}. This would be one of the oxocarbon anions, which consist solely of carbon and oxygen. The name would also be used for salts containing that anion, and for esters with the [−O−(C=O)_{5}−O−] moiety.

Removal of a single proton would result in the monovalent anion hydrogentrioxoglutarate, C_{5}HO^{−}_{7} or HO−(C=O)_{5}−O^{−}.

== Status ==
As of 2020, there seems to be no reliable published report of synthesis or isolation of the acid or its salts. It is however listed in one survey as one of the specialty chemicals produced by thermal hydrolysis of cotton hulls at a Soviet plant in the 1960s.

Also, a theoretical chemistry paper mentions it as a (hypothetical?) fully oxidized derivative of pentane.

== See also ==
- α-Ketoglutaric acid (or 2-oxoglutaric acid)
- β-Ketoglutaric acid (or 3-oxoglutaric acid)
