= Cyclobutanetetrone =

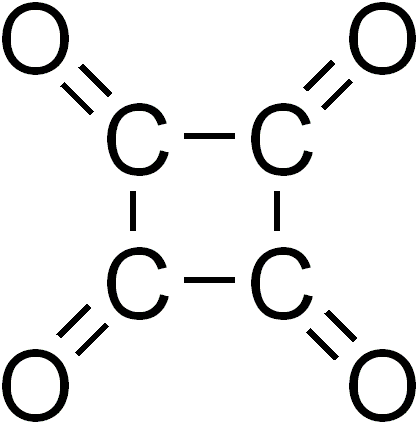

Names
- IUPAC name Cyclobutane-1,2,3,4-tetraone
- Other names Tetraoxocyclobutane

Identifiers
| CAS Number | 76719-54-5 |
| 3D model (JSmol) | Interactive image |
| ChemSpider | 24735246 |
| PubChem CID | 5488007 |
| CompTox Dashboard (EPA) | DTXSID10420518 |
- InChI: InChI=1S/C4O4/c5-1-2(6)4(8)3(1)7 Key: KDAVZOLBYGNLGF-UHFFFAOYSA-N
- SMILES: O=C1C(=O)C(=O)C1=O

Properties
| Chemical formula | C_{4}O_{4} |
| Molar mass | 112.040 g·mol^{−1} |
- Except where otherwise noted, data are given for materials in their standard state (at 25 °C [77 °F], 100 kPa). verify (what is ?) Infobox references

Cyclobutanetetrone, also called tetraoxocyclobutane, is an organic compound with formula C_{4}O_{4} or (CO)_{4}, the fourfold ketone of cyclobutane. It would be an oxide of carbon, indeed a tetramer of carbon monoxide.

The compound seems to be thermodynamically unstable. As of 2000, it had yet to be synthesized in significant amounts but may have transient existence as detected by mass spectrometry.

== Related compounds ==
Cyclobutanetetrone can be viewed as the neutral counterpart of the squarate anion C_{4}O^{2−}_{4}, which is stable and has been known at least since 1959.

The compound octahydroxycyclobutane or cyclobutaneoctaol (C(OH)_{2})_{4} may be referred to in the literature as "hydrated tetraoxocyclobutane".

== See also ==
- Cyclohexanehexone
- Cyclopentanepentone
