= Benzoquinonetetracarboxylic acid =

Names
- Preferred IUPAC name 3,6-Dioxocyclohexa-1,4-diene-1,2,4,5-tetracarboxylic acid

Identifiers
CAS Number	500797-27-3
3D model (JSmol)	Interactive image
ChemSpider	310781
PubChem CID	350050
UNII	5BE47MRU9L
CompTox Dashboard (EPA)	DTXSID101029309
- InChI: InChI=1S/C10H4O10/c11-5-1(7(13)14)2(8(15)16)6(12)4(10(19)20)3(5)9(17)18/h(H,13,14)(H,15,16)(H,17,18)(H,19,20) Key: DMCTUEIMZPODLV-UHFFFAOYSA-N; InChI=1/C10H4O10/c11-5-1(7(13)14)2(8(15)16)6(12)4(10(19)20)3(5)9(17)18/h(H,13,14)(H,15,16)(H,17,18)(H,19,20) Key: DMCTUEIMZPODLV-UHFFFAOYAE
- SMILES: C1(=C(C(=O)C(=C(C1=O)C(=O)O)C(=O)O)C(=O)O)C(=O)O

Properties
Chemical formula	C_{10}H_{4}O_{10}
Molar mass	284.14 g/mol
- Except where otherwise noted, data are given for materials in their standard state (at 25 °C [77 °F], 100 kPa). verify (what is ?) Infobox references

In chemistry, 1,4-benzoquinonetetracarboxylic acid is an organic compound with formula C_{10}H_{4}O_{10}, or (C_{6}O_{2})(-(CO)OH)_{4}, which can be viewed as deriving from para-benzoquinone C_{6}H_{4}O_{2} through replacement of the four hydrogen atoms by carboxyl functional groups -(CO)OH.

By removal of four protons, the acid is expected to yield the anion C_{10}O^{4−}_{10}, benzoquinonetetracarboxylate, which is one of the oxocarbon anions (consisting solely of oxygen and carbon). By loss of 1 through 3 protons, it forms the anions C_{10}H_{3}O^{−}_{10}, C_{10}H_{2}O^{2−}_{10}, and C_{10}HO^{3−}_{10}, called respectively trihydrogen-, dihydrogen-, and hydrogenbenzoquinonetetracarboxylate. The same names are used for the corresponding esters.

Removal of two water molecules gives the compound benzoquinonetetracarboxylic dianhydride, C_{10}O_{8}, one of the oxides of carbon.

The acid can be obtained from durene (1,2,4,5-tetramethylbenzene) via dinitropyromellitic and diaminopyromellitic acids.

== See also ==
- Mellitic acid C_{12}H_{6}O_{12}
- Tetrahydroxybenzoquinone C_{6}H_{4}O_{6}
- Benzenehexol C_{6}H_{6}O_{6}
