= Acylpyruvate hydrolase =

Class of enzymes

acylpyruvate hydrolase

Identifiers
- EC no.: 3.7.1.5
- CAS no.: 54004-67-0

Databases
- IntEnz: IntEnz view
- BRENDA: BRENDA entry
- ExPASy: NiceZyme view
- KEGG: KEGG entry
- MetaCyc: metabolic pathway
- PRIAM: profile
- PDB structures: RCSB PDB PDBe PDBsum
- Gene Ontology: AmiGO / QuickGO
Search
- PMC: articles
- PubMed: articles
- NCBI: proteins

In enzymology, an acylpyruvate hydrolase (EC 3.7.1.5) is an enzyme that catalyzes the chemical reaction

a 3-acylpyruvate + H_{2}O $\rightleftharpoons$ a carboxylate + pyruvate

Thus, the two substrates of this enzyme are 3-acylpyruvate and water, whereas its two products are carboxylate and pyruvate.

This enzyme belongs to the family of hydrolases, specifically those acting on carbon-carbon bonds in ketonic substances. The systematic name of this enzyme class is 3-acylpyruvate acylhydrolase. This enzyme participates in tyrosine metabolism.
