= Cyclohexanehexathione =

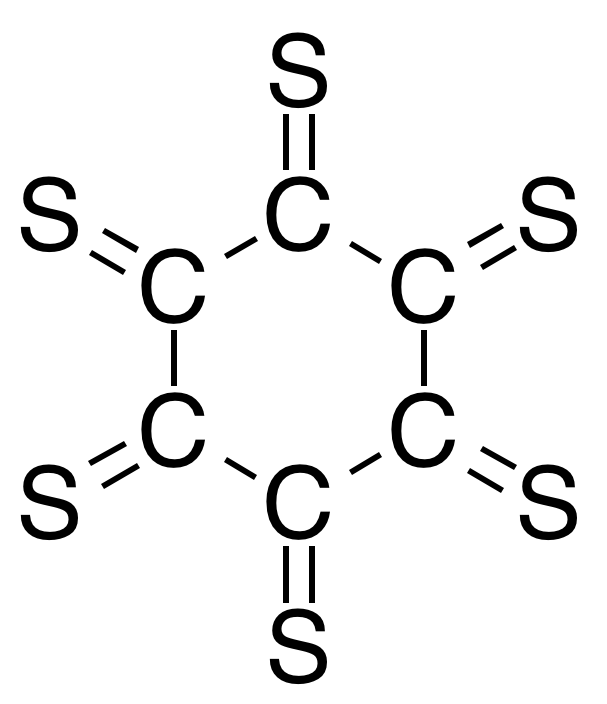

Names
- Preferred IUPAC name Cyclohexanehexathione
- Other names: 1,2,3,4,5,6-Cyclohexanehexathione; Cyclohexane-1,2,3,4,5,6-hexathione

Identifiers
CAS Number	129917-29-9
3D model (JSmol)	Interactive image
ChemSpider	28680776
PubChem CID	71340739
CompTox Dashboard (EPA)	DTXSID00767863
- InChI: InChI=1S/C6S6/c7-1-2(8)4(10)6(12)5(11)3(1)9 Key: OZKIZIQFPZROOY-UHFFFAOYSA-N; InChI=1S/C6S6/c7-1-2(8)4(10)6(12)5(11)3(1)9 Key: OZKIZIQFPZROOY-UHFFFAOYSA-N
- SMILES: C1(=S)C(=S)C(=S)C(=S)C(=S)C1=S

Properties
Chemical formula	C_{6}S_{6}
Molar mass	264.43 g·mol^{−1}
- Except where otherwise noted, data are given for materials in their standard state (at 25 °C [77 °F], 100 kPa). verify (what is ?) Infobox references

Cyclohexanehexathione is a cyclic covalent compound consisting of a six-carbon ring with a sulfur bonded to each. It has been generated by neutralization of its monoanion (C_{6}S^{−}_{6}) in a mass spectrometer. This compound is the thioketone analog of cyclohexanehexone; that oxygen variant is expected to be substantially less stable. Synthesis of C_{6}S_{6} by photolysis or pyrolysis to extrude three equivalents of carbon monoxide from a precursor containing adjacent pairs of sulfurs as cyclic dithiocarbonate units gave what is more likely a different valence isomer, as various dithiete-containing structures are predicted to be more stable than the hexathione form.

Proposed valence isomers of cyclohexanehexathione
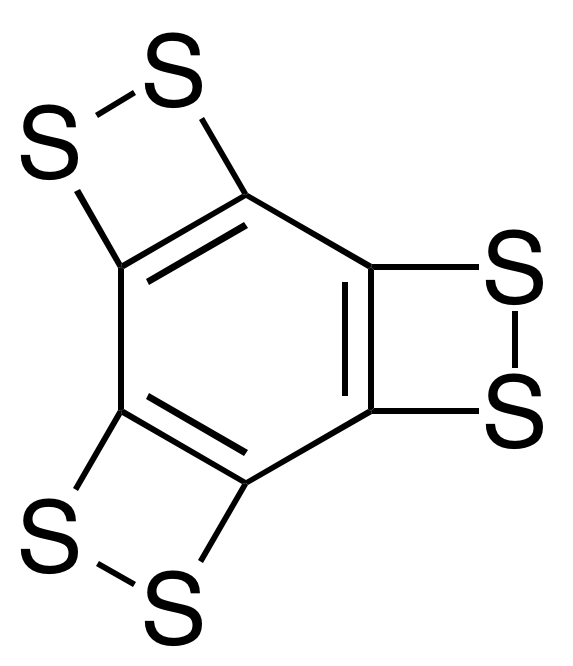

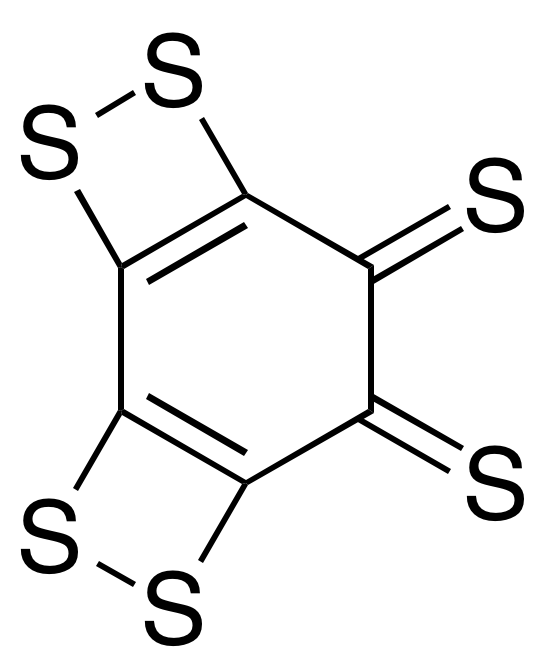

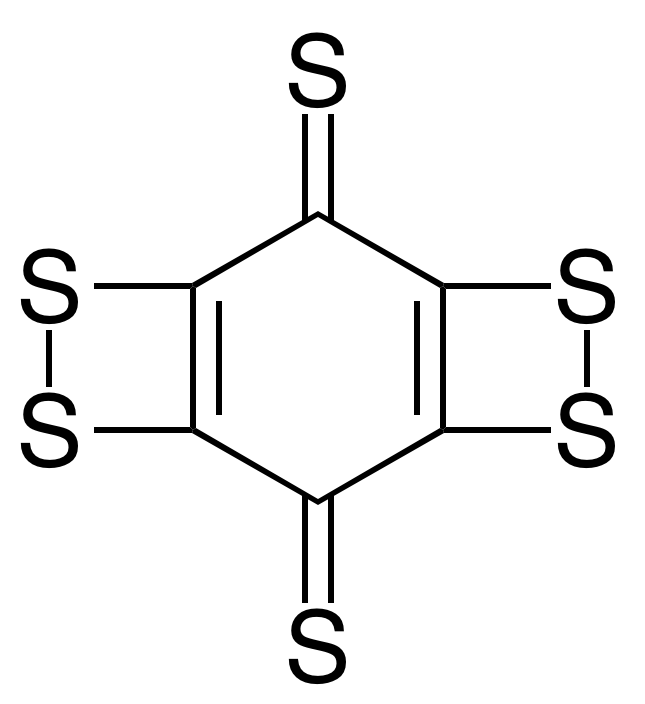

This theoretical analysis of the various isomers and experimental analysis of this reaction cast doubt on whether the mass spectrometric approach really did produce the hexathione isomer as originally claimed. The increased stability of dithietes as compared to dioxetane-like rings is one of theoretical bases for proposing C_{6}S_{6} is more stable than the oxygen analog.
