= Benzoquinonetetracarboxylic dianhydride =

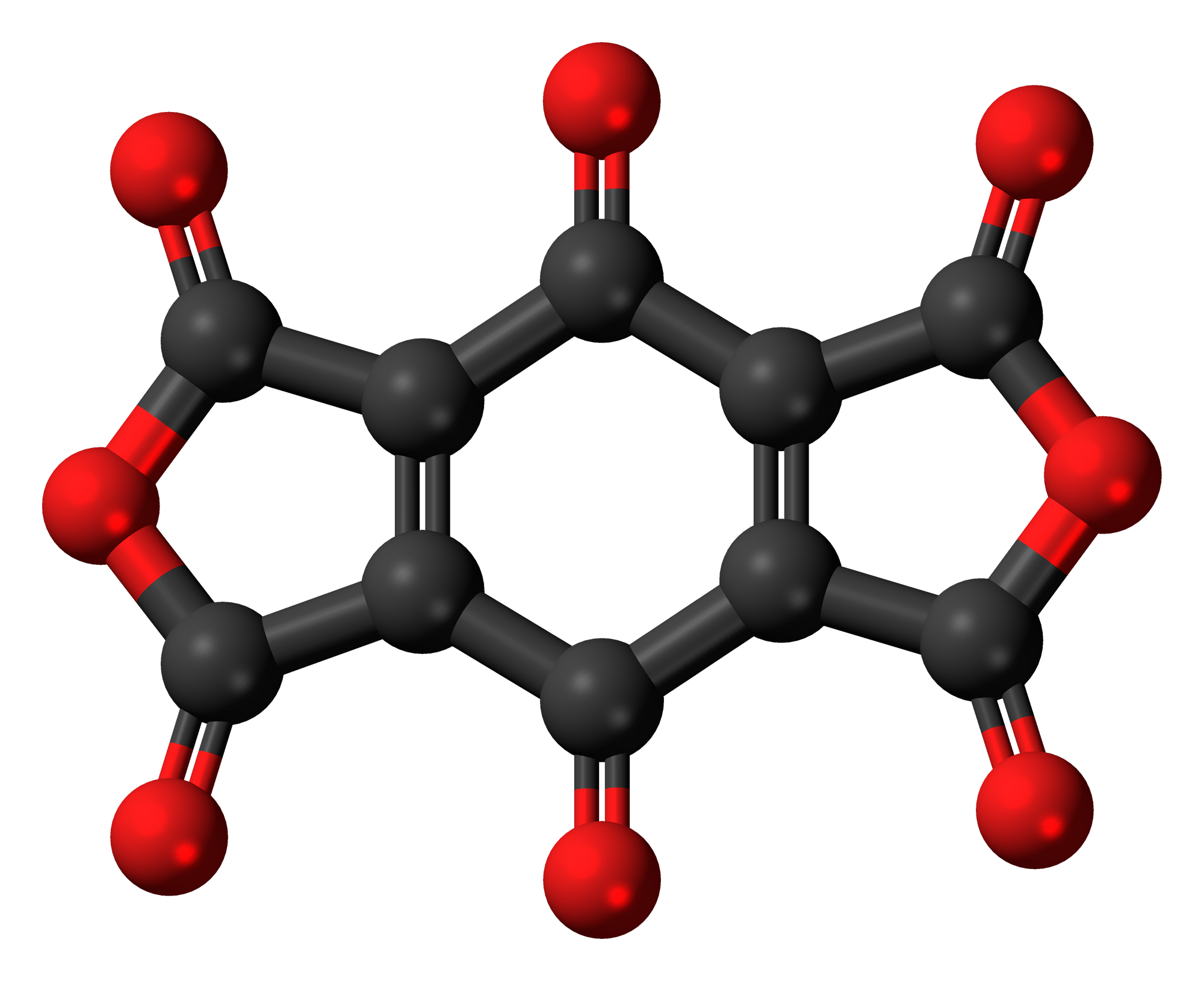

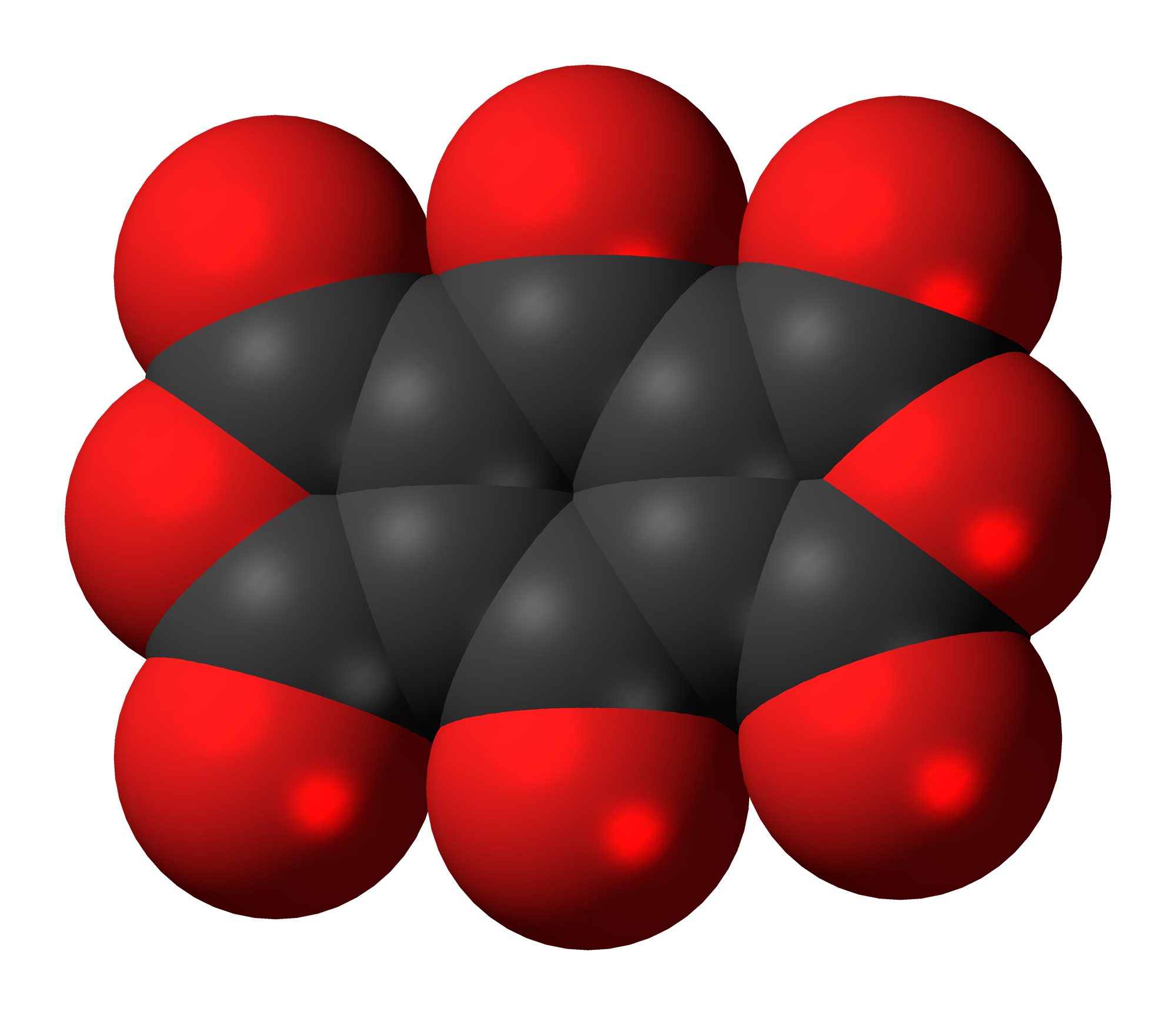
Benzoquinonetetracarboxylic dianhydride molecule

Names
- Preferred IUPAC name 1H,3H-Benzo[1,2-c:4,5-c′]difuran-1,3,4,5,7,8-hexone

Identifiers
CAS Number	32192-32-8
3D model (JSmol)	Interactive image
ChemSpider	32686035
PubChem CID	85781674
UNII	X95MUN2THQ
CompTox Dashboard (EPA)	DTXSID401029310
- InChI: InChI=1S/C10O8/c11-5-1-2(8(14)17-7(1)13)6(12)4-3(5)9(15)18-10(4)16 Key: NWWNDTOPIPOVFQ-UHFFFAOYSA-N; InChI=1/C10O8/c11-5-1-2(8(14)17-7(1)13)6(12)4-3(5)9(15)18-10(4)16 Key: NWWNDTOPIPOVFQ-UHFFFAOYAX
- SMILES: O=C(C(C(O3)=O)=C1C3=O)C2=C(C(OC2=O)=O)C1=O

Properties
Chemical formula	C_{10}O_{8}
Molar mass	248.102 g·mol^{−1}
- Except where otherwise noted, data are given for materials in their standard state (at 25 °C [77 °F], 100 kPa). verify (what is ?) Infobox references

Benzoquinonetetracarboxylic dianhydride is an organic compound with formula C_{10}O_{8} (an oxide of carbon) which can be seen as the result of removing two molecules of water H_{2}O from benzoquinonetetracarboxylic acid.

It is a red solid, stable in dry air up to 140 °C and insoluble in ether, carbon tetrachloride, dichloromethane, and carbon disulfide. It reacts with acetone, ethyl acetate, tetrahydrofuran, ethanol, and water. It dissolves in methylated derivatives of benzene to give solutions ranging from orange to violet. When the molecule is exposed to moist air, it quickly turns blue.

The compound was synthesized in 1963 by P. R. Hammond, who claimed it was "one of the strongest π-electron acceptors so far described."

== See also ==
- Ethylenetetracarboxylic dianhydride
- Tetrahydroxy-1,4-benzoquinone biscarbonate
- Tetrahydroxy-1,4-benzoquinone bisoxalate
