= Rhodizonic acid =

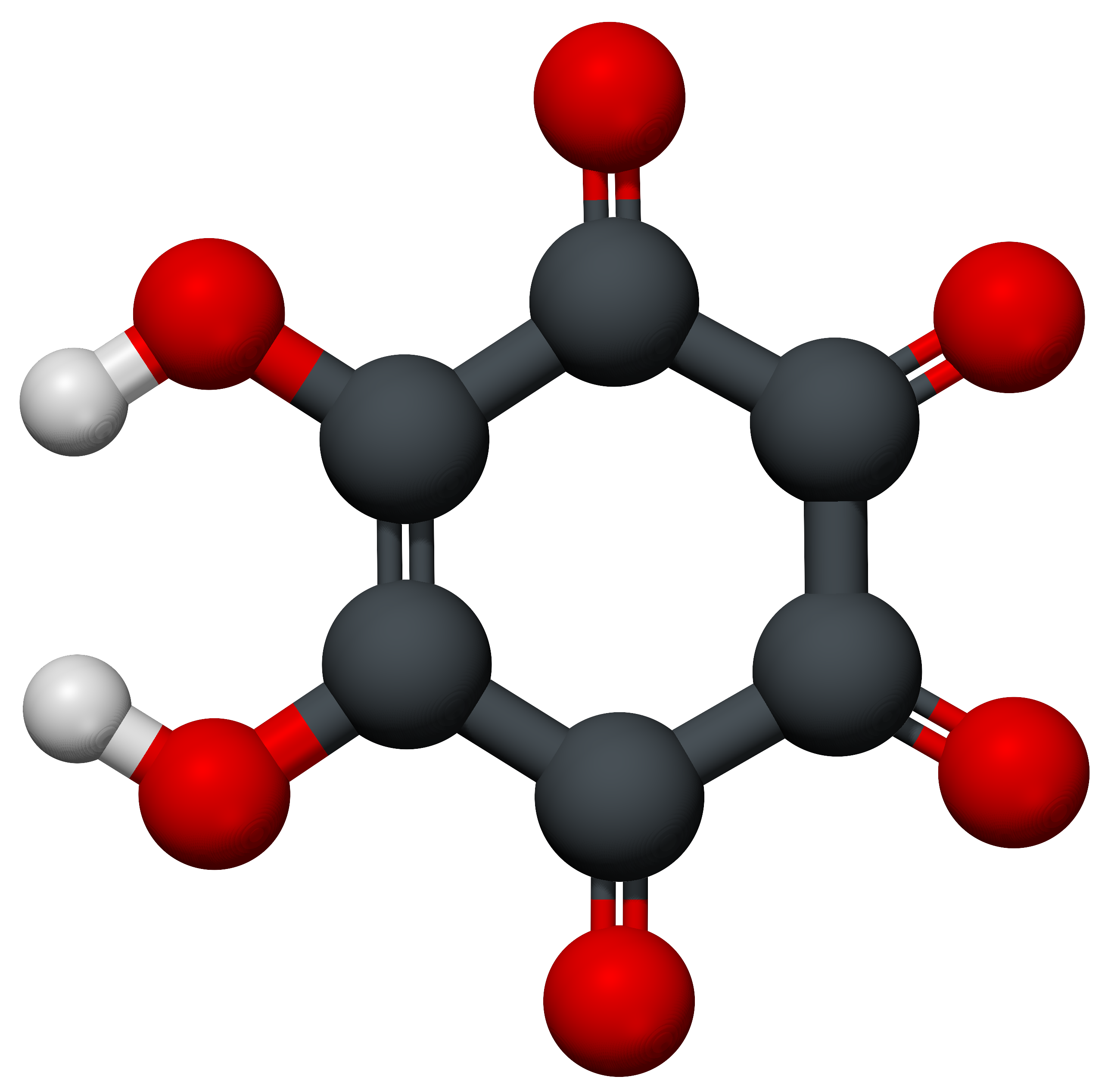

Names
- Preferred IUPAC name 5,6-Dihydroxycyclohex-5-ene-1,2,3,4-tetrone
- Other names dihydroxydiquinoyl dioxydiquinone

Identifiers
CAS Number	118-76-3 (dihydrate)
3D model (JSmol)	Interactive image
ChemSpider	60401
ECHA InfoCard	100.003.888
EC Number	204-276-5
MeSH	C005690
PubChem CID	67050
UNII	NG86FBS267
CompTox Dashboard (EPA)	DTXSID70151997
- InChI: InChI=1S/C6H2O6/c7-1-2(8)4(10)6(12)5(11)3(1)9/h7-8H Key: WCJLIWFWHPOTAC-UHFFFAOYSA-N; InChI=1/C6H2O6/c7-1-2(8)4(10)6(12)5(11)3(1)9/h7-8H Key: WCJLIWFWHPOTAC-UHFFFAOYAV
- SMILES: C1(=C(C(=O)C(=O)C(=O)C1=O)O)O

Properties
Chemical formula	H_{2}C_{6}O_{6}
Molar mass	170.076 g·mol^{−1}
Appearance	Orange to deep-red highly hygroscopic crystals
Melting point	130 to 132 °C (266 to 270 °F; 403 to 405 K)
- Except where otherwise noted, data are given for materials in their standard state (at 25 °C [77 °F], 100 kPa). verify (what is ?) Infobox references

Rhodizonic acid is a chemical compound with formula H_{2}C_{6}O_{6} or (CO)_{4}(COH)_{2}. It can be seen as a twofold enol and fourfold ketone of cyclohexene, more precisely 5,6-dihydroxycyclohex-5-ene-1,2,3,4-tetrone.

Rhodizonic acid is usually obtained in the form of a dihydrate H_{2}C_{6}O_{6}·2H_{2}O. The latter is actually 2,3,5,5,6,6-hexahydroxycyclohex-2-ene-1,4-dione, where two of the original ketone groups are replaced by two pairs of geminal diols. The orange to deep-red and highly hygroscopic anhydrous acid can be obtained by low-pressure sublimation of the dihydrate.

Like many other enols, rhodizonic acid can lose the hydrogen cations H^{+} from the hydroxyls (pK_{a1} = 4.378±0.009, pK_{a2} = 4.652±0.014 at 25 °C), yielding the hydrogen rhodizonate anion HC_{6}O^{−}_{6} and the rhodizonate anion C_{6}O^{2−}_{6}. The latter is aromatic and symmetric, as the double bond and the negative charges are delocalized and evenly distributed over the six CO units. Rhodizonates tend to have various shades of red, from yellowish to purplish.

Rhodizonic acid has been used in chemical assays for barium, lead, and other metals. In particular, the sodium rhodizonate test can be used to detect gunshot residue (which contains lead) in a subject's hands, and to distinguish arrow wounds from gunshot wounds for hunting regulation enforcement.

== History ==
Rhodizonic acid was discovered by Austrian chemist Johann Heller in 1837, by analyzing the products of heating a mixture of potassium carbonate and charcoal. The name comes from Greek ῥοδίζω (rhodizō, "to tinge red"), on account of the color of its salts.

== Chemistry ==
=== Salts ===
Rhodizonates tend to have various shades of red, from yellowish to purplish, in transmitted light, with a greenish luster in reflected light.

Potassium rhodizonate can be prepared with good yield and purity by oxidizing inositol with nitric acid and reacting the result with potassium acetate in the presence of oxygen. The rhodizonate crystallizes out of the solution due to its relative insolubility in water.

Sodium rhodizonate is dark brown and stable when dry, but the aqueous solution decomposes in a few days, even in the refrigerator. Lead rhodizonate is dark violet.

=== Oxidation and decomposition ===
Rhodizonic acid is a member of a chain of oxidation products: benzenehexol (COH)_{6}, tetrahydroxybenzoquinone (THBQ) (COH)_{4}(CO)_{2}, rhodizonic acid (COH)_{2}(CO)_{4}, and the fleeting cyclohexanehexone (CO)_{6}. Lithium rhodizonate, together with salts of THBQ and benzenehexol, has been considered for possible use in rechargeable electrical batteries. The monovalent anion C_{6}O^{−}_{6} has been detected in mass spectrometry experiments.

Rhodizonic acid and the rhodizonate anion can lose one of the CO units to yield croconic acid (CO)_{3}(COH)_{2} and the croconate anion C_{5}O^{2−}_{5}, respectively, by mechanisms that are still imperfectly known. In basic solutions (pH > 10), rhodizonic acid quickly converts to the THBQ anion (CO)^{4−}_{6} in the absence of oxygen, and to croconic acid in its presence. At pH 8.3 and exposure to light, solutions are stable for days in the absence of oxygen, and decompose to croconic acid and other products (possibly including cyclohexanehexone or dodecahydroxycyclohexane) in its presence.

== Structure ==
=== Acid ===
In solution, the acid and the hydrogen rhodizonate ion are mostly hydrated, with some of the carbonyl groups >C=O replaced by geminal hydroxyls, >C(OH)_{2}.

=== Salts ===
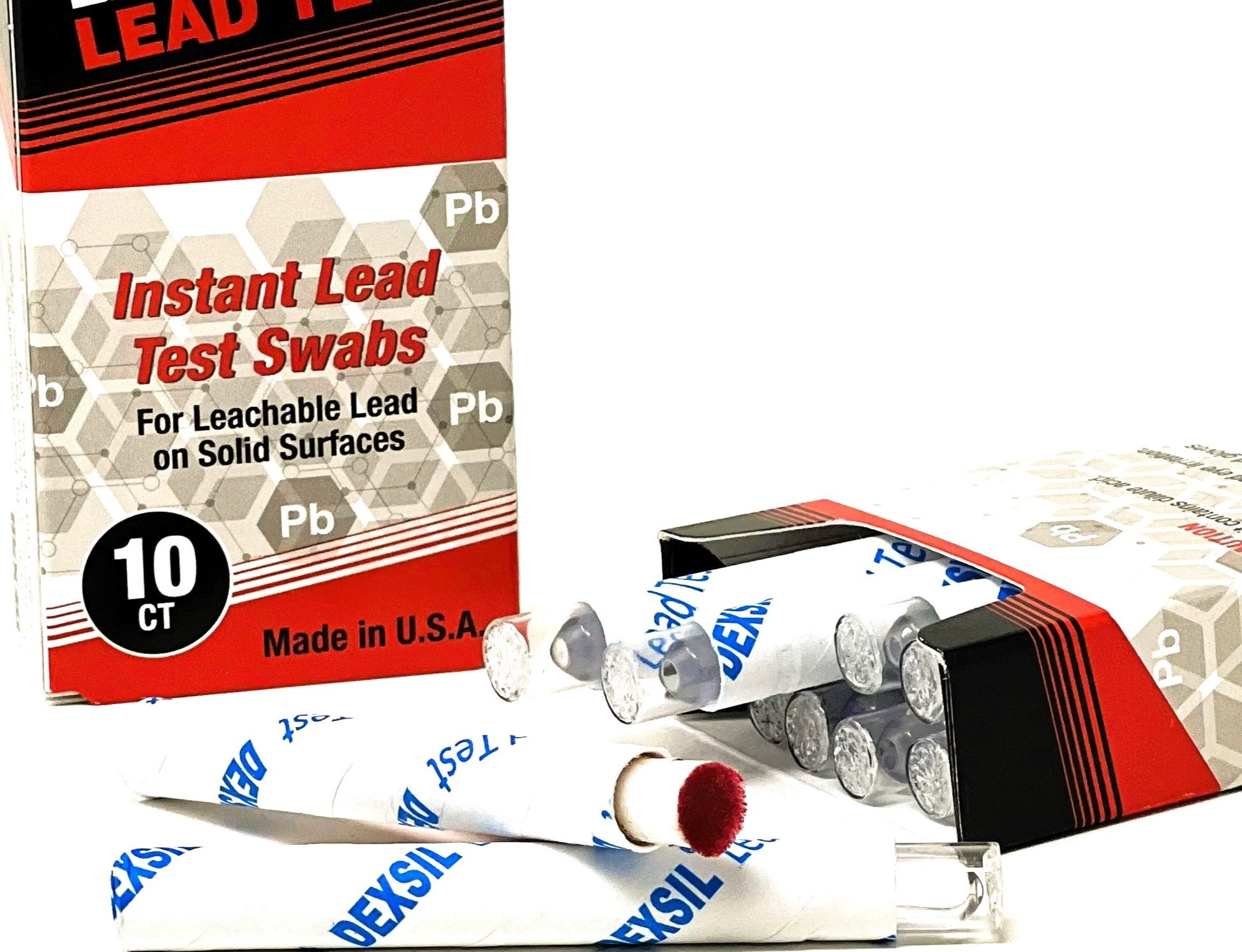
Lead Test Swab Containing Ampulized Rhodizonate

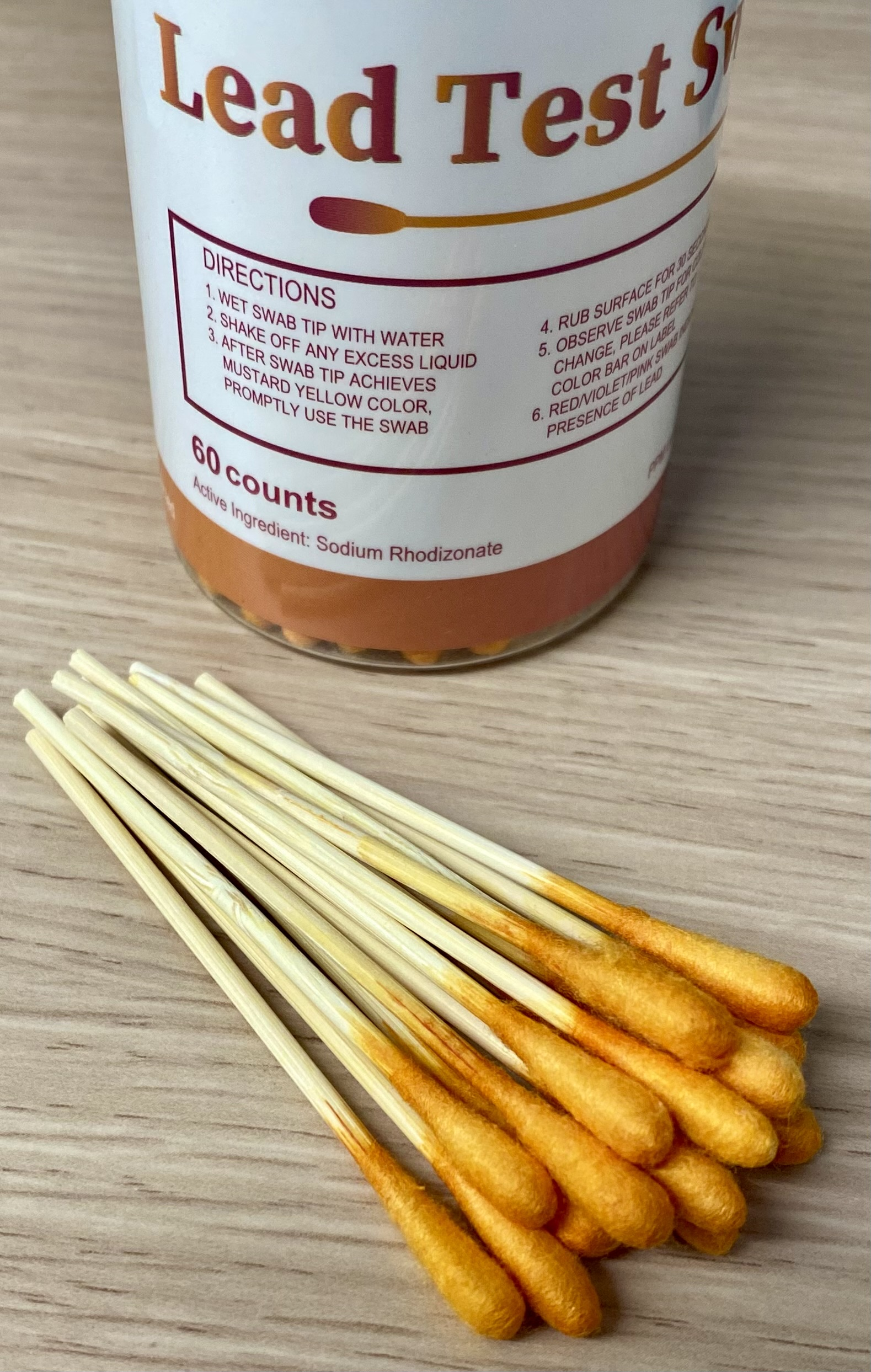
The sodium salt of rhodizonic acid is used in commercial lead testing kits

In anhydrous rubidium rhodizonate (Rb^{+})_{2}[C_{6}O_{6}]^{2−}, the rhodizonate anions are stacked in parallel columns, as are the rubidium ions. In the plane perpendicular to the columns, these are arranged as two interleaved hexagonal grids. The anions are planar.

Anhydrous potassium rhodizonate (K^{+})_{2}[C_{6}O_{6}]^{2−} has a distinct but similar structure. The anions and cations are arranged in alternate planes. Within each plane, the anions are arranged in a hexagonal grid. Each potassium ion is arranged so that it connects symmetrically to eight oxygens of four anions, two from each adjacent plane. The anions are slightly twisted in the "boat" shape (with 0.108 Å of rms deviation from mean plane). Sodium rhodizonate (Na^{+})_{2}[C_{6}O_{6}]^{2−} has the same structure, with slightly more distorted anions (0.113 Å rms)

In solution, the rhodizonate anion is not hydrated.

== See also ==
- Acetylenediol (COH)_{2}
- Deltic acid (CO)(COH)_{2}
- Squaric acid (CO)_{2}(COH)_{2}
- Croconic acid (CO)_{3}(COH)_{2}
