= Ethylenetetracarboxylic acid =

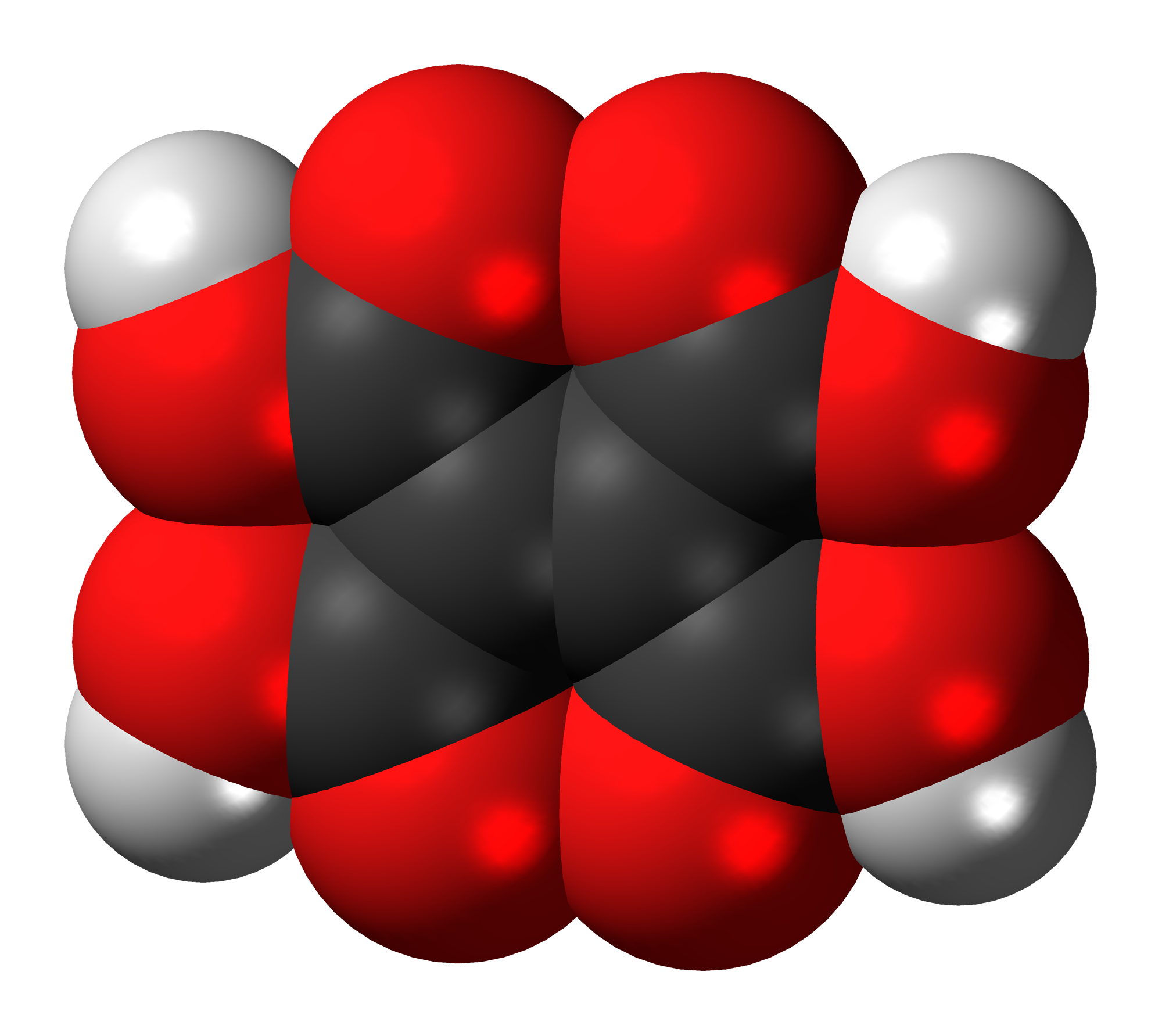

Names
- IUPAC name Ethene-1,1,2,2-tetracarboxylic acid

Identifiers
CAS Number	4363-44-4
3D model (JSmol)	Interactive image
ChemSpider	11636515
PubChem CID	12651152
UNII	MV8N94W7XP
CompTox Dashboard (EPA)	DTXSID20505724
- InChI: InChI=1S/C6H4O8/c7-3(8)1(4(9)10)2(5(11)12)6(13)14/h(H,7,8)(H,9,10)(H,11,12)(H,13,14) Key: AIJZIRPGCQPZSL-UHFFFAOYSA-N; InChI=1/C6H4O8/c7-3(8)1(4(9)10)2(5(11)12)6(13)14/h(H,7,8)(H,9,10)(H,11,12)(H,13,14) Key: AIJZIRPGCQPZSL-UHFFFAOYAE
- SMILES: O=C(O)/C(C(O)=O)=C(C(O)=O)\C(O)=O

Properties
Chemical formula	C_{6}H_{4}O_{8}
Molar mass	204.090 g·mol^{−1}
- Except where otherwise noted, data are given for materials in their standard state (at 25 °C [77 °F], 100 kPa). verify (what is ?) Infobox references

Ethylenetetracarboxylic acid is an organic compound with formula C_{6}H_{4}O_{8}, or (HO(OC)-)_{2}C=C(-(CO)OH)_{2}.

By removal of four protons, the acid yields the anion C_{6}O^{4−}_{8}, ethylenetetracarboxylate, which is one of the oxocarbon anions (consisting solely of oxygen and carbon). By loss of 1 through 3 protons, it forms the anions C_{6}H_{3}O^{−}_{8}, C_{6}H_{2}O^{2−}_{8}, and C_{6}HO^{3−}_{8}, called respectively trihydrogen-, dihydrogen-, and hydrogenethylenetetracarboxylate. The same names are used for the corresponding esters.

The acid can be obtained by hydrolysis of tetraethyl ethylenetetracarboxylate, which in turn can be obtained from diethyl dibromomalonate with sodium iodide.

Ethylenetetracarboxylic dianhydride, a twofold acid anhydride of this compound, can be formed by direct dehydration at high temperature.
