= Methanetetracarboxylate =

Ion

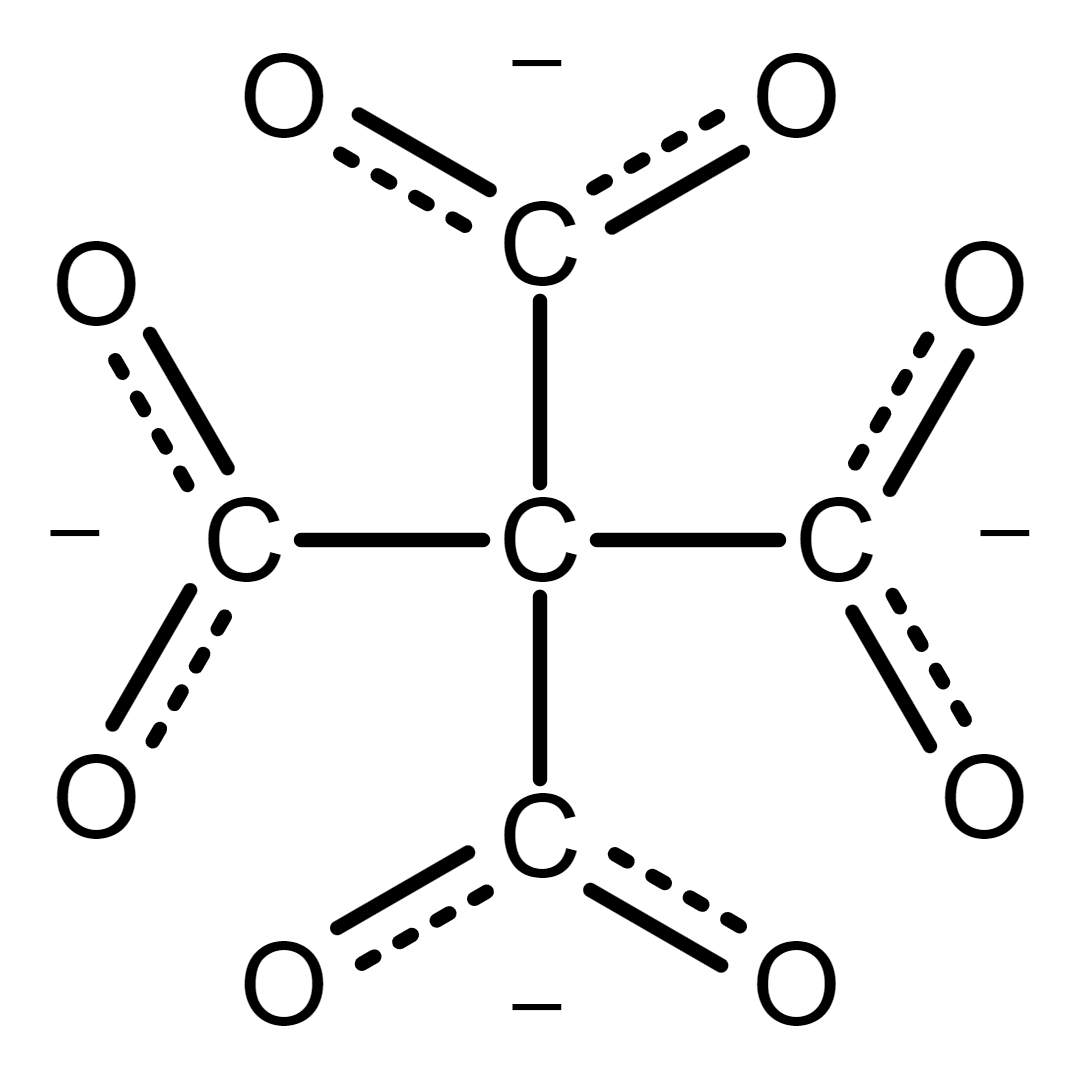

- Dots that are highlighted in blue carry a partial negative charge. Red dots are oxygen atoms, black dots are carbon atoms.

Names
- Preferred IUPAC name Methanetetracarboxylate

Identifiers
CAS Number	acid: 193197-67-0
3D model (JSmol)	: Interactive image; Interactive image; acid: Interactive image
PubChem CID	57459306; acid: 19035093
- InChI: : InChI=1S/C5H4O8/c6-1(7)5(2(8)9,3(10)11)4(12)13/h(H,6,7)(H,8,9)(H,10,11)(H,12,13)/p-4 Key: NKVMCSDLYHGDMD-UHFFFAOYSA-J; acid: InChI=1S/C5H4O8/c6-1(7)5(2(8)9,3(10)11)4(12)13/h(H,6,7)(H,8,9)(H,10,11)(H,12,13) Key: NKVMCSDLYHGDMD-UHFFFAOYSA-N
- SMILES: : C(=O)(C(C(=O)[O-])(C(=O)[O-])C(=O)[O-])[O-]; O=C([O-])C(C([O-])=O)(C([O-])=O)C([O-])=O; acid: C(=O)(C(C(=O)O)(C(=O)O)C(=O)O)O

Properties
Chemical formula	C(CO^{−}_{2})_{4}
Molar mass	188.047 g·mol^{−1}
- Except where otherwise noted, data are given for materials in their standard state (at 25 °C [77 °F], 100 kPa). Infobox references

Methanetetracarboxylate is the tetraanion with formula C(CO_{2})^{4−}_{4}. It has four carboxylate groups attached to a central carbon atom; so it has the same carbon backbone as neopentane. It is an oxocarbon anion, that is, consists only of carbon and oxygen.

The term is also used for any salt with that anion; or for any ester with the C(−C(=O)−O−)_{4} moiety.

The salts and esters are relatively uncommon, and their uses appear to be limited to chemical research. Sodium methanetetracarboxylate Na_{4}C(CO_{2})_{4} can be obtained by oxidation of pentaerythritol C(CH_{2}OH)_{4} with oxygen in sodium hydroxide solution at pH 10 and about 60 °C, in the presence of palladium as a catalyst.

The anion can be seen as the result of removing four protons from methanetetracarboxylic acid, a hypothetical organic compound with formula H_{4}C_{5}O_{8} or C(COOH)_{4}. This acid has not been synthesised (as of 2009), and is believed to be unstable, but its ethyl ester, tetraethyl methanetetracarboxylate, C(COOCH_{2}CH_{3})_{4}, is a specialty chemical and has been used in organic synthesis.
