= Dioxosuccinic acid =

- Skeletal formula

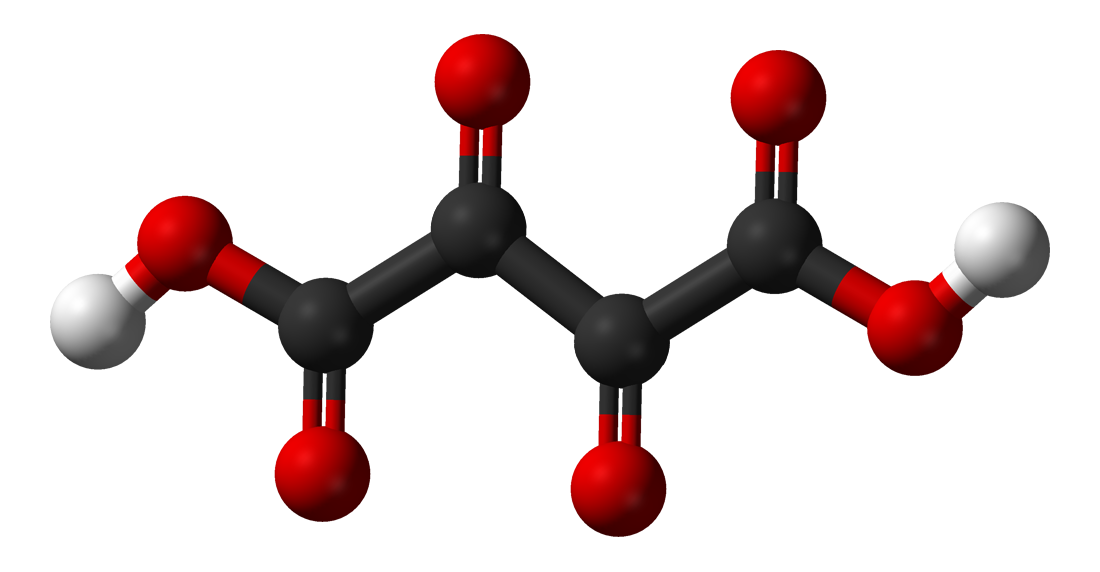
- Ball-and-stick model

Names
- Preferred IUPAC name Dioxobutanedioic acid
- Other names Dioxosuccinic acid 2,3-Dioxosuccinic acid

Identifiers
| CAS Number | 7580-59-8 |
| 3D model (JSmol) | Interactive image |
| Beilstein Reference | 956740 |
| ChEBI | CHEBI:30799 |
| ChemSpider | 74061 |
| ECHA InfoCard | 100.028.622 |
| EC Number | 231-483-8 |
| PubChem CID | 82062 |
| UNII | D82LW8DKT2 |
| CompTox Dashboard (EPA) | DTXSID30226716 |
- InChI: InChI=1S/C4H2O6/c5-1(3(7)8)2(6)4(9)10/h(H,7,8)(H,9,10) Key: BLNNXYDKWOJQGK-UHFFFAOYSA-N; InChI=1/C4H2O6/c5-1(3(7)8)2(6)4(9)10/h(H,7,8)(H,9,10) Key: BLNNXYDKWOJQGK-UHFFFAOYAK
- SMILES: C(=O)(C(=O)C(=O)O)C(=O)O

Properties
| Chemical formula | C_{4}H_{2}O_{6} |
| Molar mass | 146.054 g·mol^{−1} |
- Except where otherwise noted, data are given for materials in their standard state (at 25 °C [77 °F], 100 kPa). verify (what is ?) Infobox references

Dioxosuccinic acid or dioxobutanedioic acid is an organic compound with formula C_{4}H_{2}O_{6} or HO−(C=O)_{4}−OH.

Removal of two protons from the molecule would yield the dioxosuccinate anion, C_{4}O^{2−}_{6} or ^{−}O−(C=O)_{4}−O^{−}. This is one of the oxocarbon anions, which consist solely of carbon and oxygen. The name is also used for salts containing that anion, and for esters with the [−O−(C=O)_{4}−O−] moiety.

Removal of a single proton would result in the monovalent anion hydrogendioxosuccinate, C_{4}HO^{−}_{6} or HO−(C=O)_{4}−O^{−}.

== Occurrence ==
Dioxosuccinic acid is one of the acids occurring naturally in wine, from the oxidation of tartaric acid via dihydroxyfumaric acid.

== Reactions ==
The acid combines with two molecules of water to produce dihydroxytartaric acid, the ketone hydrate form, C_{4}H_{6}O_{8} or HO−(C=O)−(C(OH)_{2})_{2}−(C=O)−OH. Indeed, the product traded under the name "dioxosuccinic acid hydrate" appears to be that substance.

Dihydroxytartaric acid behaves like dioxosuccinic acid in some reactions; for example, it reacts with ethanol in the presence of hydrogen chloride to yield the ester diethyl dioxosuccinate, upon isolation.

== See also ==
- Mesoxalic acid
- Oxaloacetic acid (or oxosuccinic acid)
- Fumaric acid
