= Tetrahydroxy-1,4-benzoquinone =

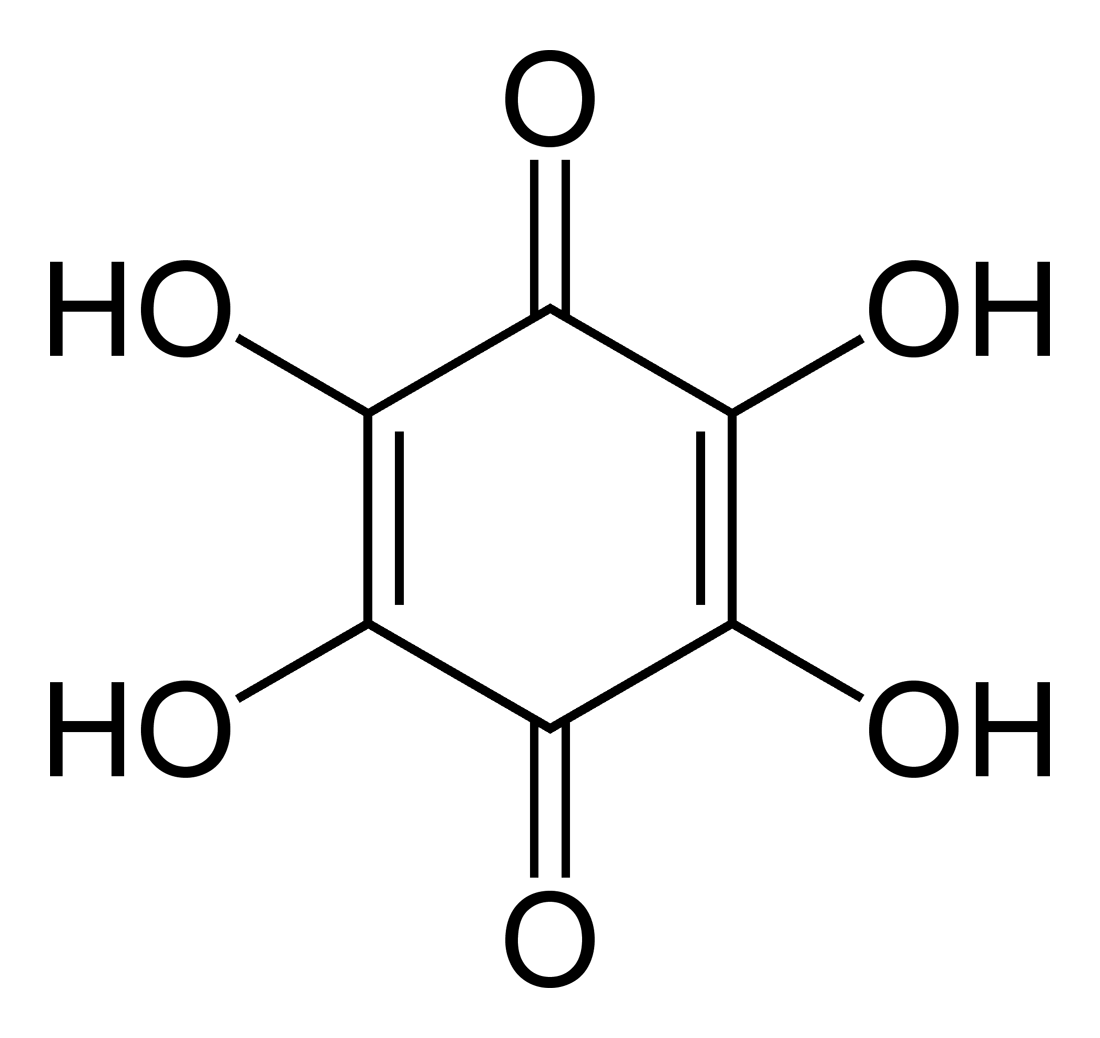
- Skeletal formula

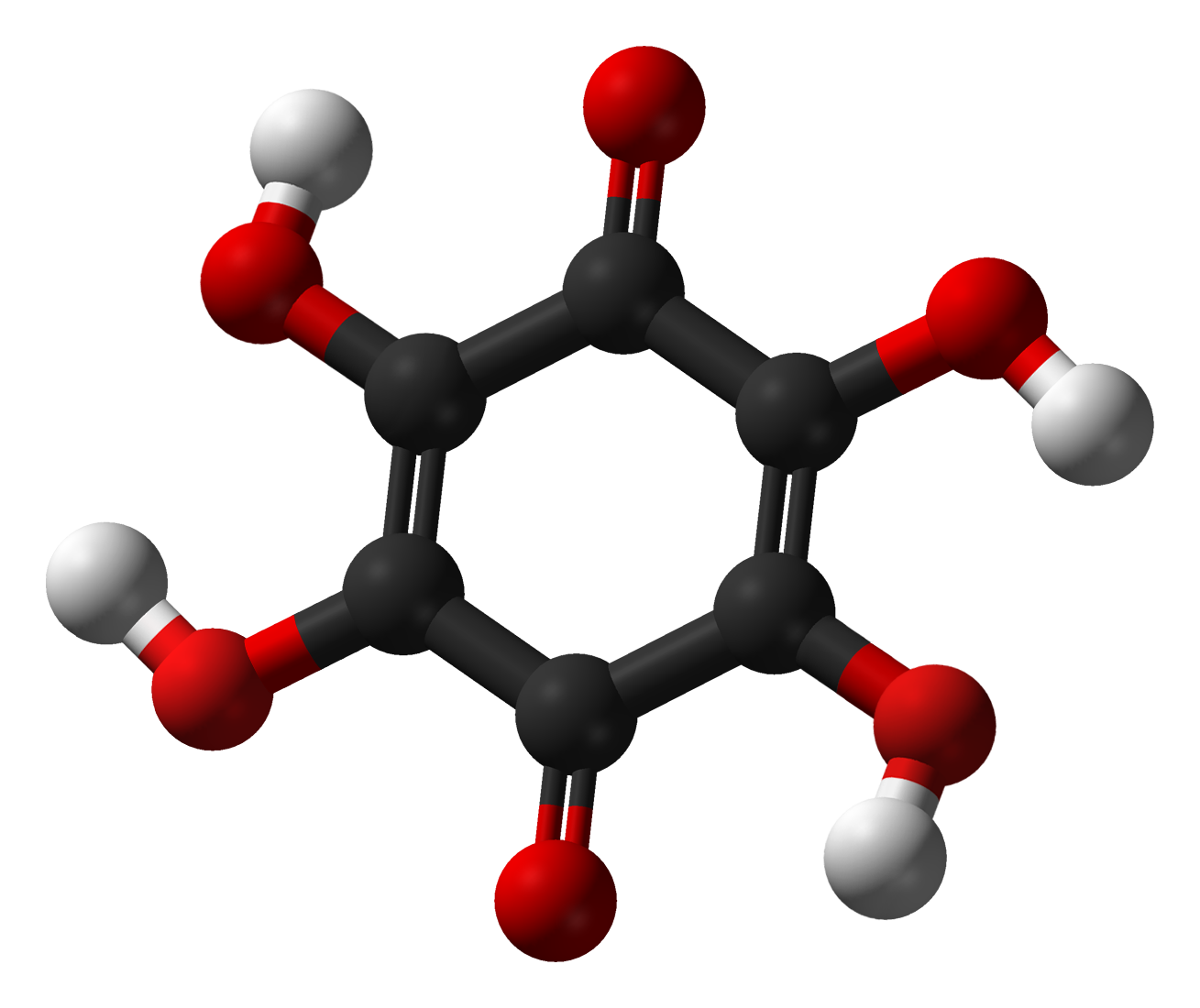
- Ball-and-stick model

Names
- Preferred IUPAC name 2,3,5,6-Tetrahydroxycyclohexa-2,5-diene-1,4-dione
- Other names Tetroquinone

Identifiers
CAS Number	319-89-1
3D model (JSmol)	Interactive image
ChEBI	CHEBI:137472
ChEMBL	ChEMBL1329029
ChemSpider	5231
ECHA InfoCard	100.005.706
EC Number	206-275-5
KEGG	D06096
PubChem CID	5424
UNII	U7L4P6H0SU
CompTox Dashboard (EPA)	DTXSID9045897
- InChI: InChI=1S/C6H4O6/c7-1-2(8)4(10)6(12)5(11)3(1)9/h7-8,11-12H Key: DGQOCLATAPFASR-UHFFFAOYSA-N
- SMILES: O=C(C(O)=C1O)C(O)=C(O)C1=O

Properties
Chemical formula	C_{6}H_{4}O_{6}
Molar mass	172.092 g·mol^{−1}
Appearance	Blue-black crystals
Density	2.609 g/cm3
Boiling point	370.6 °C (699.1 °F; 643.8 K) at 760 mmHg
Solubility in water	Slightly soluble in cold water

Hazards
- GHS labelling
Pictograms	(GHS07: Exclamation mark)
Signal word	Warning
Hazard statements	H315, H319, H335
Precautionary statements	P261, P264, P271, P280, P302+P352, P304+P340, P305+P351+P338, P312, P321, P332+P313, P337+P313, P362, P403+P233, P405, P501
Flash point	192.1 °C (377.8 °F; 465.2 K)
- Except where otherwise noted, data are given for materials in their standard state (at 25 °C [77 °F], 100 kPa). verify (what is ?) Infobox references

Tetrahydroxy-1,4-benzoquinone, also called tetrahydroxy-p-benzoquinone, tetrahydroxybenzoquinone, or tetrahydroxyquinone (THBQ, THQ), is an organic compound with formula C_{6}O_{2}(OH)_{4}. Its molecular structure consists of a cyclohexadiene ring with four hydroxyl groups and two ketone groups in opposite (para) positions.

The compound gives a light red solution in water, and crystallizes as the glistening bluish-black (but non-conducting) dihydrate C_{6}O_{2}(OH)_{4}·2H_{2}O.

The compound can be synthesized from glyoxal or from myo-inositol, a natural compound widely present in plants. THBQ forms an adduct with 4,4′-bipyridine in a 2:3 ratio.

== Salts of THBQ ==
Like most phenols, THBQ is acidic and easily loses the four hydrogen ions from the hydroxyl groups, yielding anions such as C_{6}H_{2}O^{2−}_{6} and C_{6}O^{4−}_{6}.

The calcium salt Ca_{2}C_{6}O_{6} is the dark purple pigment produced from inositol by Chromohalobacter beijerinckii in the fermentation of salt beans, already noted by T. Hof in 1935.

The dark purple and insoluble dipotassium salt K_{2}C_{6}H_{2}O_{6} was prepared by Preisler and Berger in 1942, by oxidizing inositol with nitric acid and reacting the result with potassium carbonate in the presence of oxygen. Reaction of this salt with hydrochloric acid produces THBQ in good yield.

The black tetrapotassium salt K_{4}C_{6}O_{6} was prepared by West and Niu in 1962, by reacting THBQ with potassium methoxide in methanol. The salt is diamagnetic and the infrared spectrum suggests that the C–C and C–O distances are all equal, with the ring slightly distorted in the "chair" conformation. Partial oxidation of K_{4}C_{6}O_{6} affords a green, strongly paramagnetic solid, conjectured to be 3K^{+}·C_{6}O^{3−}_{6}, and complete oxidation yields potassium rhodizonate 2K^{+}·C_{6}O^{2−}_{6}.

The greenish-black sodium salt Na_{4}C_{6}O_{6} was described by Fatiadi and Sanger in 1962.

The dark-violet lithium salt Li_{4}C_{6}O_{6} has been proposed as an electrode material for batteries as it can be oxidized to the rhodizonate Li_{2}C_{6}O_{6} and reduced to the hexahydroxybenzene salt Li_{6}C_{6}O_{6}. In the absence of oxygen, Li_{4}C_{6}O_{6} is stable to about 450 °C and then decomposes leaving a residue of lithium carbonate. Indeed, the rhodizonate appears to disproportionate at about 400 °C into Li_{4}C_{6}O_{6} and cyclohexanehexone C_{6}O_{6} that promptly decomposes into carbon monoxide, carbon dioxide, and carbon. Li_{4}C_{6}O_{6} forms a hydrate Li_{4}C_{6}O_{6}·2H_{2}O that loses its water at about 250 °C.
