= Benzenehexol =

- Skeletal formula

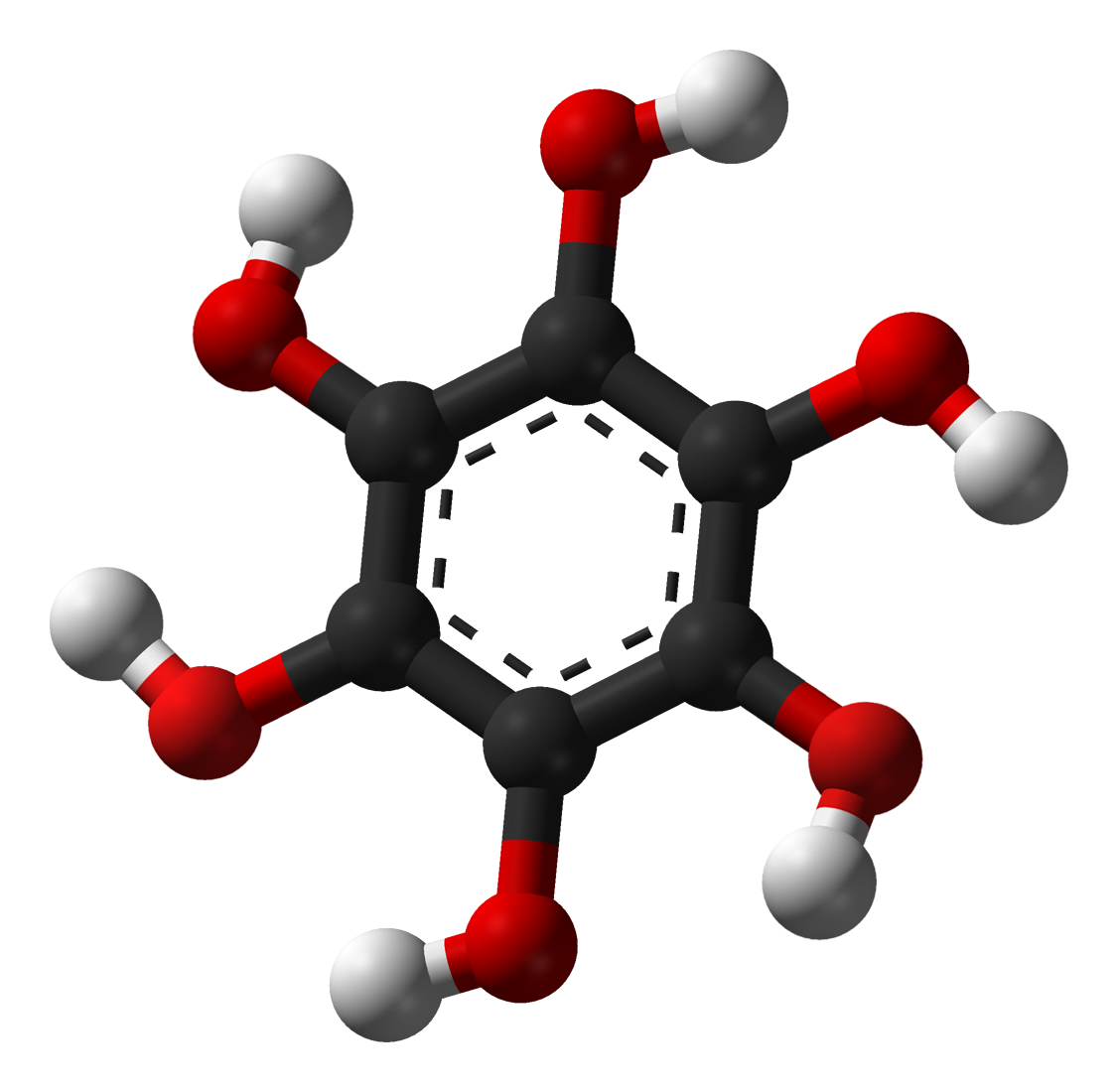

Names
- Preferred IUPAC name Benzenehexol
- Other names Benzene-1,2,3,4,5,6-hexol; Hexahydroxybenzene; 2,3,4,5,6-pentahydroxyphenol 1,2,3,4,5,6-hexahydroxybenzene Hexaphenol; Fenolão

Identifiers
CAS Number	608-80-0
3D model (JSmol)	Interactive image
ChemSpider	62319
ECHA InfoCard	100.204.877
PubChem CID	69102
UNII	80XJ9A89E2
CompTox Dashboard (EPA)	DTXSID0060563
- InChI: InChI=1S/C6H6O6/c7-1-2(8)4(10)6(12)5(11)3(1)9/h7-12H Key: VWPUAXALDFFXJW-UHFFFAOYSA-N; InChI=1/C6H6O6/c7-1-2(8)4(10)6(12)5(11)3(1)9/h7-12H Key: VWPUAXALDFFXJW-UHFFFAOYAU
- SMILES: c1(c(c(c(c(c1O)O)O)O)O)O

Properties
Chemical formula	C_{6}H_{6}O_{6}
Molar mass	174.108 g·mol^{−1}
- Except where otherwise noted, data are given for materials in their standard state (at 25 °C [77 °F], 100 kPa). verify (what is ?) Infobox references

Benzenehexol, also called hexahydroxybenzene, is an organic compound with formula C_{6}H_{6}O_{6} or C_{6}(OH)_{6}. It is a six-fold phenol of benzene. The product is also called hexaphenol, but this name has been used also for other substances.

Benzenehexol is a crystalline solid soluble in hot water, with a melting point above 310°. It can be prepared from inositol (cyclohexanehexol). Oxidation of benzenehexol yields tetrahydroxy-p-benzoquinone (THBQ), rhodizonic acid, and dodecahydroxycyclohexane. Conversely, benzenehexol can be obtained by reduction of sodium THBQ salt with SnCl_{2}/HCl.

Benzenehexol is a starting material for a class of discotic liquid crystals.

Benzenehexol forms an adduct with 2,2'-bipyridine, with 1:2 molecular ratio.

== Benzenehexolate ==
Like most phenols, benzenehexol can lose the six H^{+} ions from the hydroxyl groups, yielding the hexaanion C_{6}O^{6−}_{6}. The potassium salt of this anion is one of the components of Liebig's so-called "potassium carbonyl", the product of the reaction of carbon monoxide with potassium. The hexaanion is produced by trimerization of the acetylenediolate anion C_{2}O^{2−}_{2} when heating potassium acetylenediolate K_{2}C_{2}O_{2}. The nature of K_{6}C_{6}O_{6} was clarified by Rudolf Nietzki and Theodor Benckiser in 1885, who found that its hydrolysis yielded benzenehexol.

The lithium salt of this anion, Li_{6}C_{6}O_{6} has been considered for electric battery applications.

== Esters ==
Hexahydroxy benzene forms esters such as the hexaacetate C_{6}(-O(CO)CH_{3})_{6} (melting point 220 °C) and ethers like hexa-tert-butoxybenzene C_{6}(-OC(CH_{3})_{3})_{6} (melting point 223 °C).
