= Cyclopentanepentone =

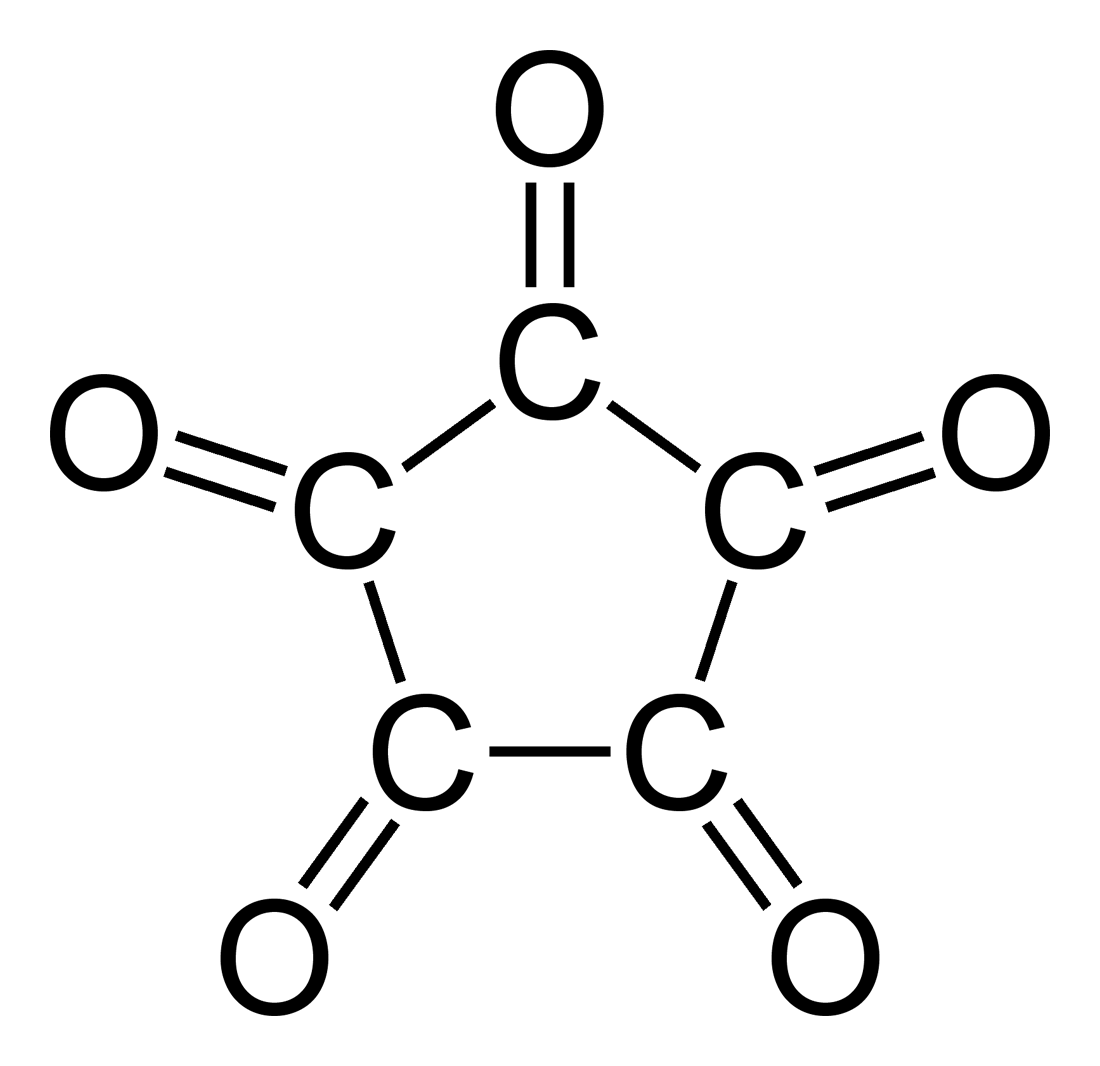
- Skeletal formula of cyclopentanepentone

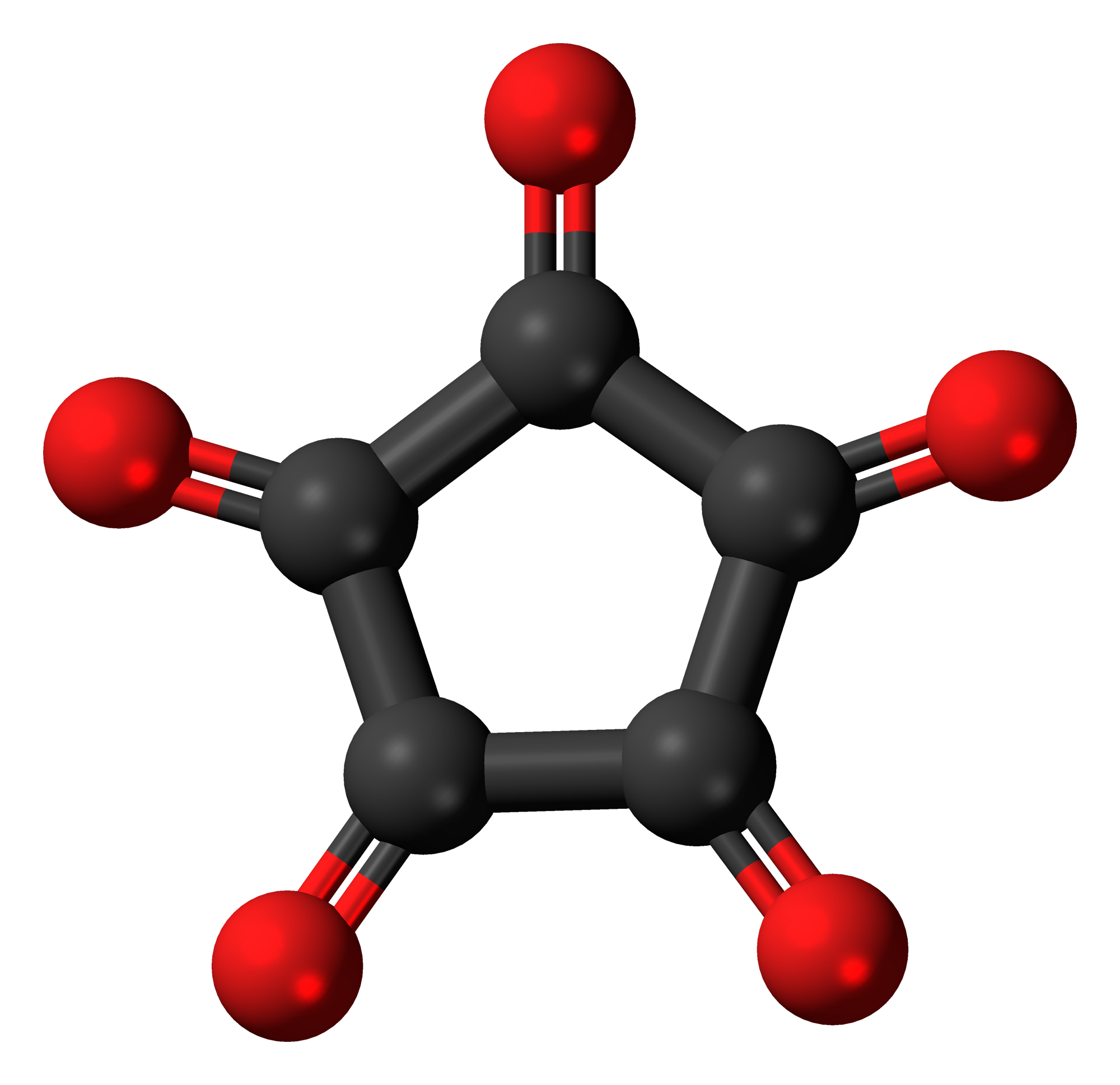

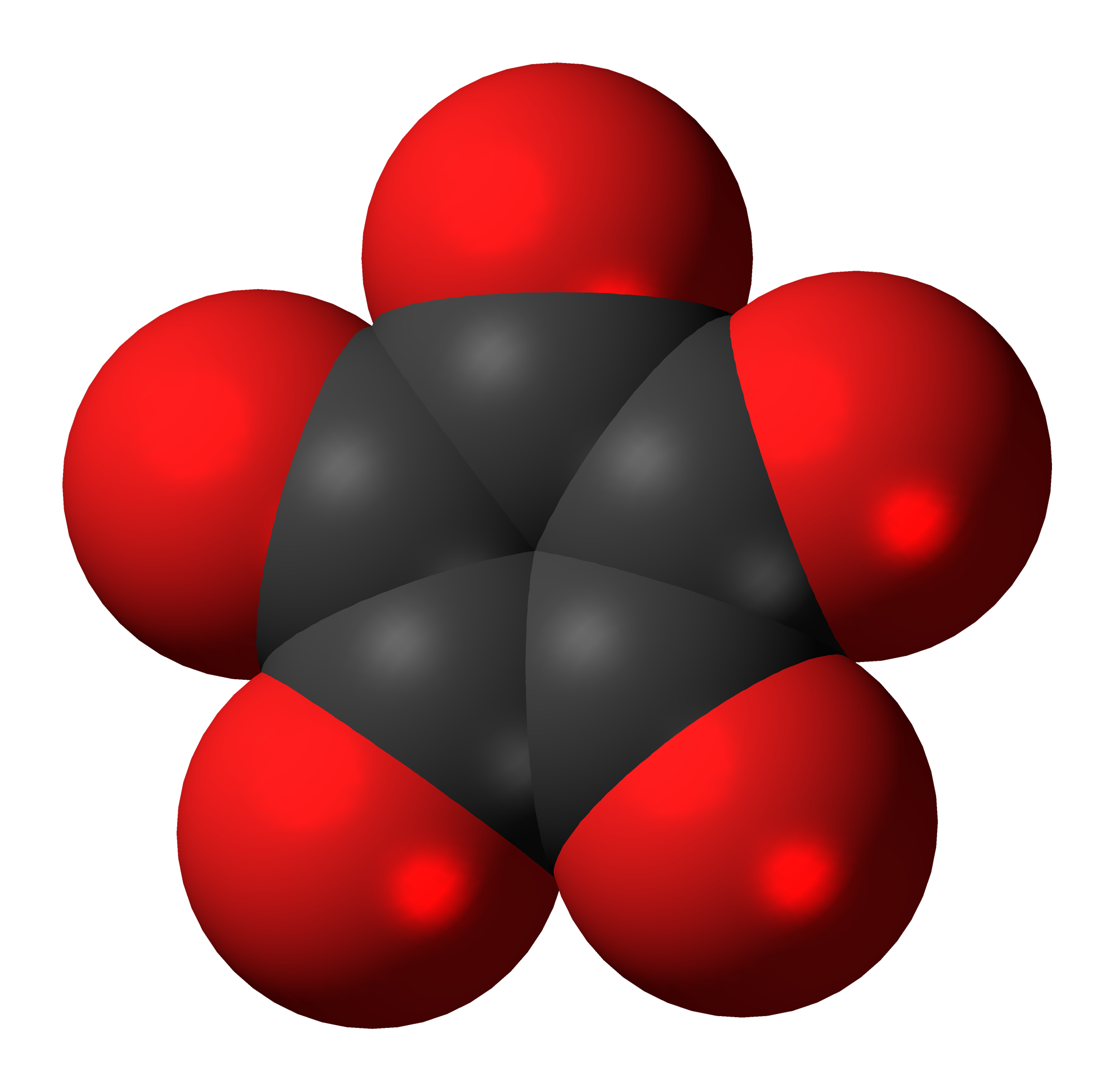

Names
- Systematic IUPAC name Cyclopentane-1,2,3,4,5-pentone
- Other names Leuconic acid

Identifiers
| CAS Number | 3617-57-0 |
| 3D model (JSmol) | Interactive image |
| ChemSpider | 16788087 |
| PubChem CID | 12305030 |
| CompTox Dashboard (EPA) | DTXSID90486718 |
- InChI: InChI=1S/C5O5/c6-1-2(7)4(9)5(10)3(1)8 Key: YVVXMBHAKNKELS-UHFFFAOYSA-N
- SMILES: O=C1C(=O)C(=O)C(=O)C1=O

Properties
| Chemical formula | C_{5}O_{5} |
| Molar mass | 140.050 g·mol^{−1} |
- Except where otherwise noted, data are given for materials in their standard state (at 25 °C [77 °F], 100 kPa). verify (what is ?) Infobox references

Cyclopentanepentone, also known as leuconic acid, is a hypothetical organic compound with formula C_{5}O_{5}, the fivefold ketone of cyclopentane. It would be an oxide of carbon (an oxocarbon), indeed a pentamer of carbon monoxide.

As of 2000, the compound had yet to be synthesized in bulk, but there have been reports of trace synthesis.

== Related compounds ==
Cyclopentanepentone can be viewed as the neutral counterpart of the croconate anion C_{5}O^{2−}_{5}.

The compound referred to in the literature and trade as "cyclopentanepentone pentahydrate" (C_{5}O_{5}·5H_{2}O) is probably decahydroxycyclopentane (C_{5}(OH)_{10}).

== See also ==
- Cyclohexanehexone
