= Ethylenetetracarboxylic dianhydride =

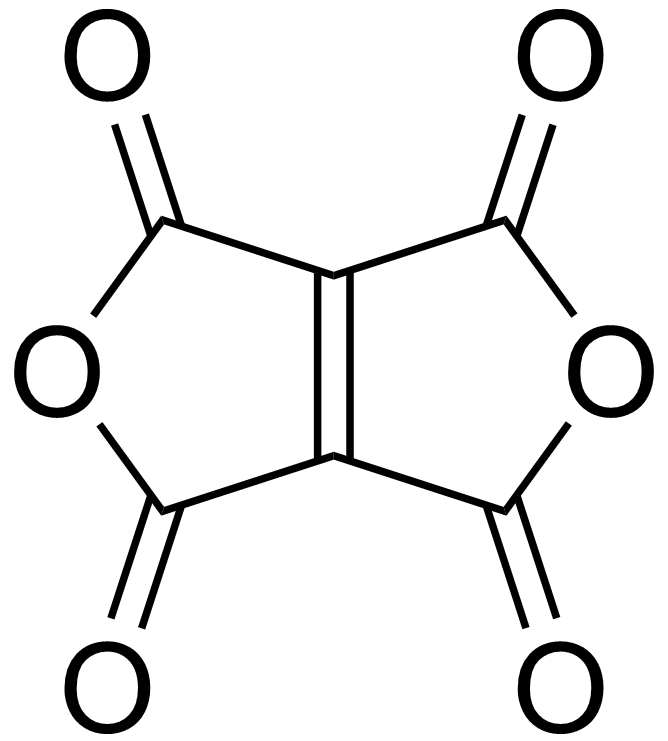

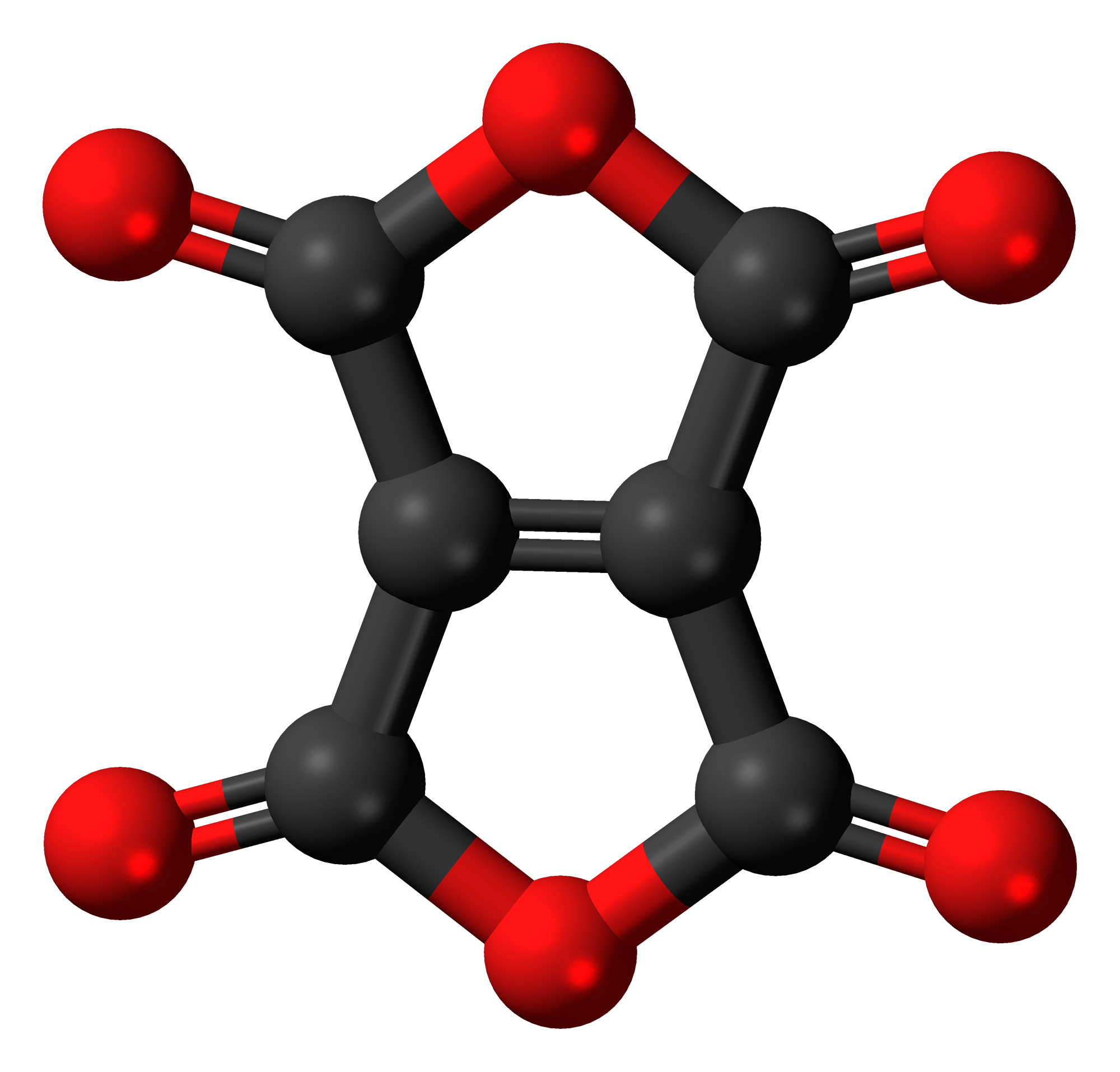

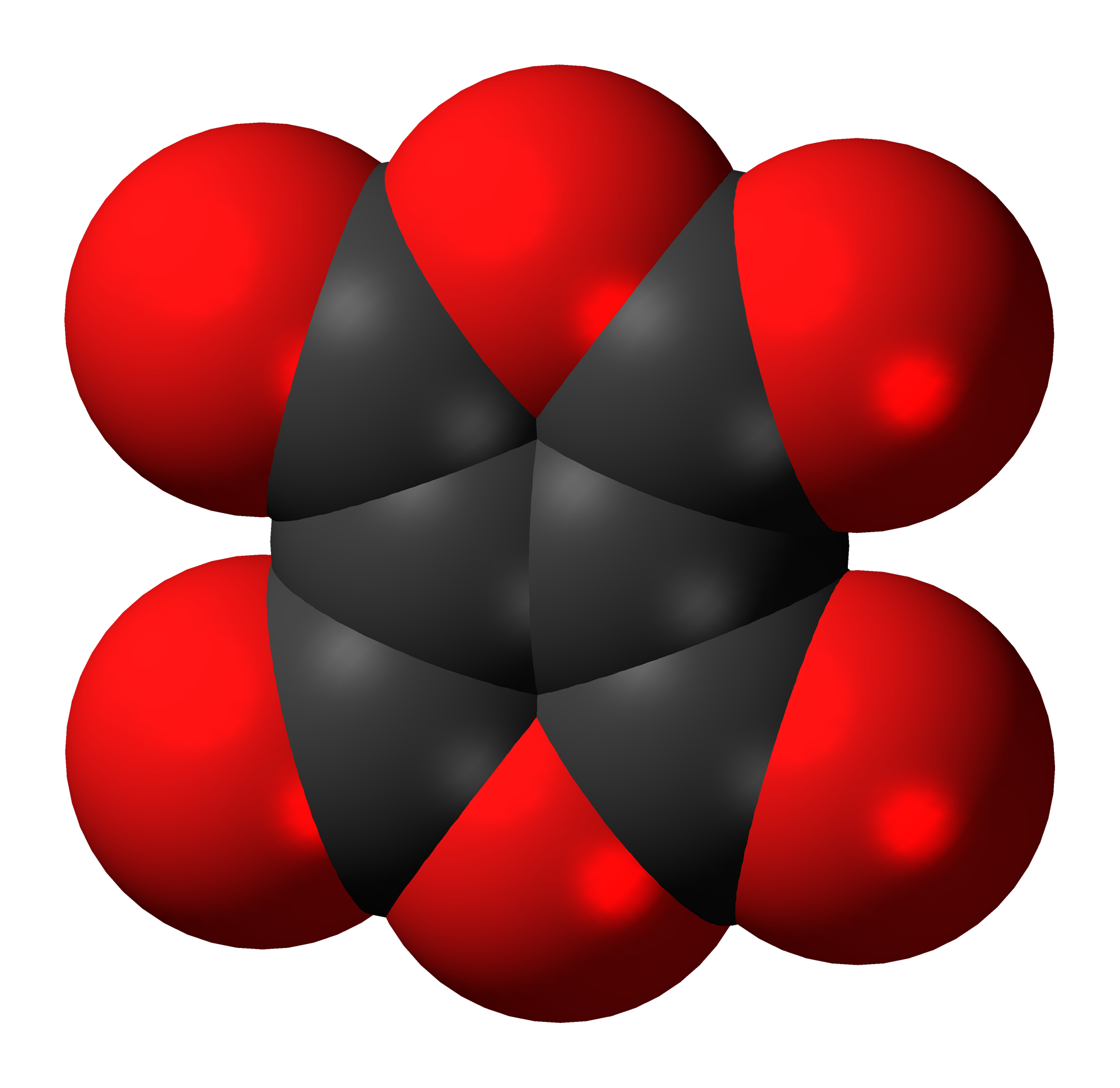

Names
- Preferred IUPAC name 1H,3H-Furo[3,4-c]furan-1,3,4,6-tetrone

Identifiers
| CAS Number | 15016-12-3 |
| 3D model (JSmol) | Interactive image |
| ChemSpider | 57437194 |
| PubChem CID | 12651153 |
| UNII | MHG9QKW2DD |
| CompTox Dashboard (EPA) | DTXSID80505725 |
- InChI: InChI=1S/C6O6/c7-3-1-2(5(9)11-3)6(10)12-4(1)8 Key: GBASTSRAHRGUAB-UHFFFAOYSA-N
- SMILES: O=C(C(C(O2)=O)=C1C2=O)OC1=O

Properties
| Chemical formula | C_{6}O_{6} |
| Molar mass | 168.060 g·mol^{−1} |
- Except where otherwise noted, data are given for materials in their standard state (at 25 °C [77 °F], 100 kPa). verify (what is ?) Infobox references

Ethylenetetracarboxylic dianhydride is a chemical compound with formula C_{6}O_{6}, that can be seen as the twofold anhydride of ethylenetetracarboxylic acid C_{6}H_{4}O_{8}. It has a bicyclic molecular structure consisting of two maleic anhydride rings fused by their respective alkene units. It is a pale yellow oily liquid, soluble in dichloromethane and chloroform.

The compound and its reactions were first reported in 1967. More recently developed reactions for its synthesis include pyrolysis of ethylenetetracarboxylic acid

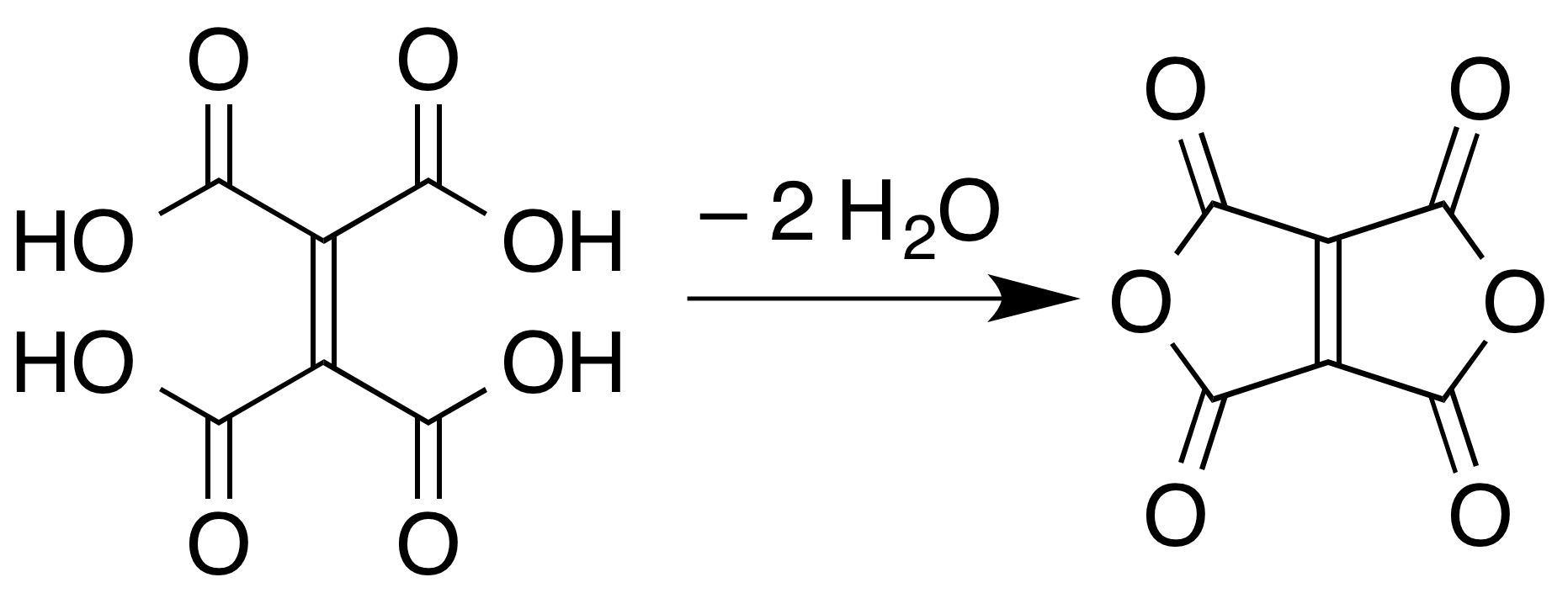

and microwave pyrolysis of solid Meldrum's acid. In this latter route, two molecules of the Meldrum's acid are believed to undergo a reductive dimerization to give an alkene linkage with one "Meldrum's acid" ring on each end. The rings then open via hydrolysis of the esters to form ethylenetetracarboxylic acid, and then the carboxylic acid units recyclize with different partners (cis on each side of the alkene) as in the simple pyrolysis of the tetraacid.

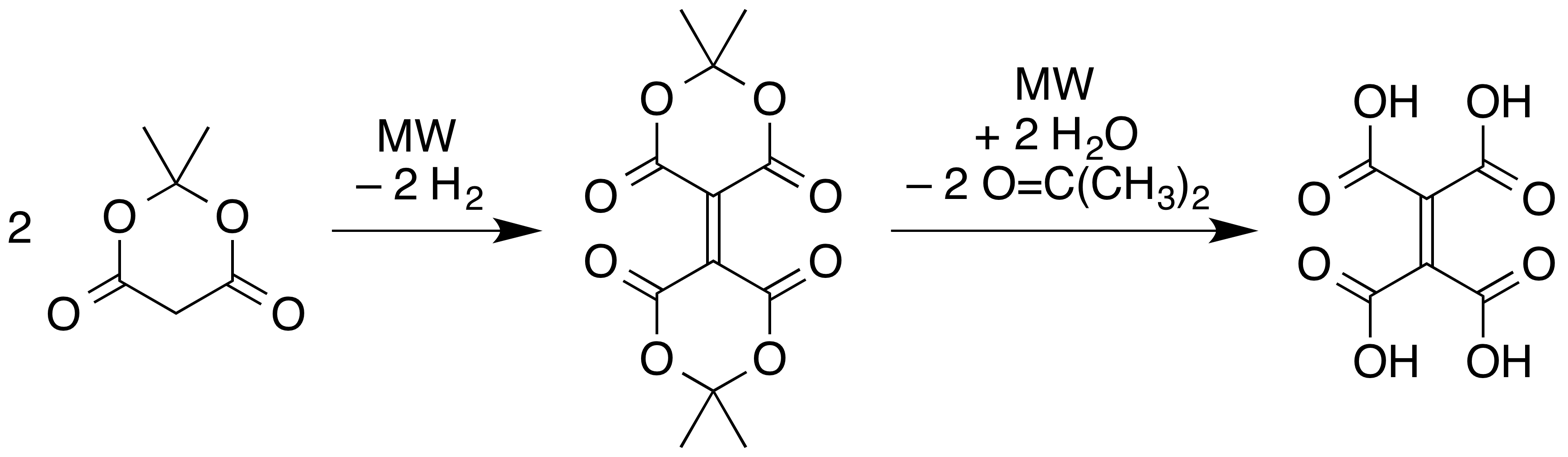

An alternative dianhydride isomer, consisting of two malonic anhydride units joined by an alkene, has not been reported in the literature.

== See also ==
- Cyclohexanehexone, an elusive isomer.
