= Cyclohexanehexone =

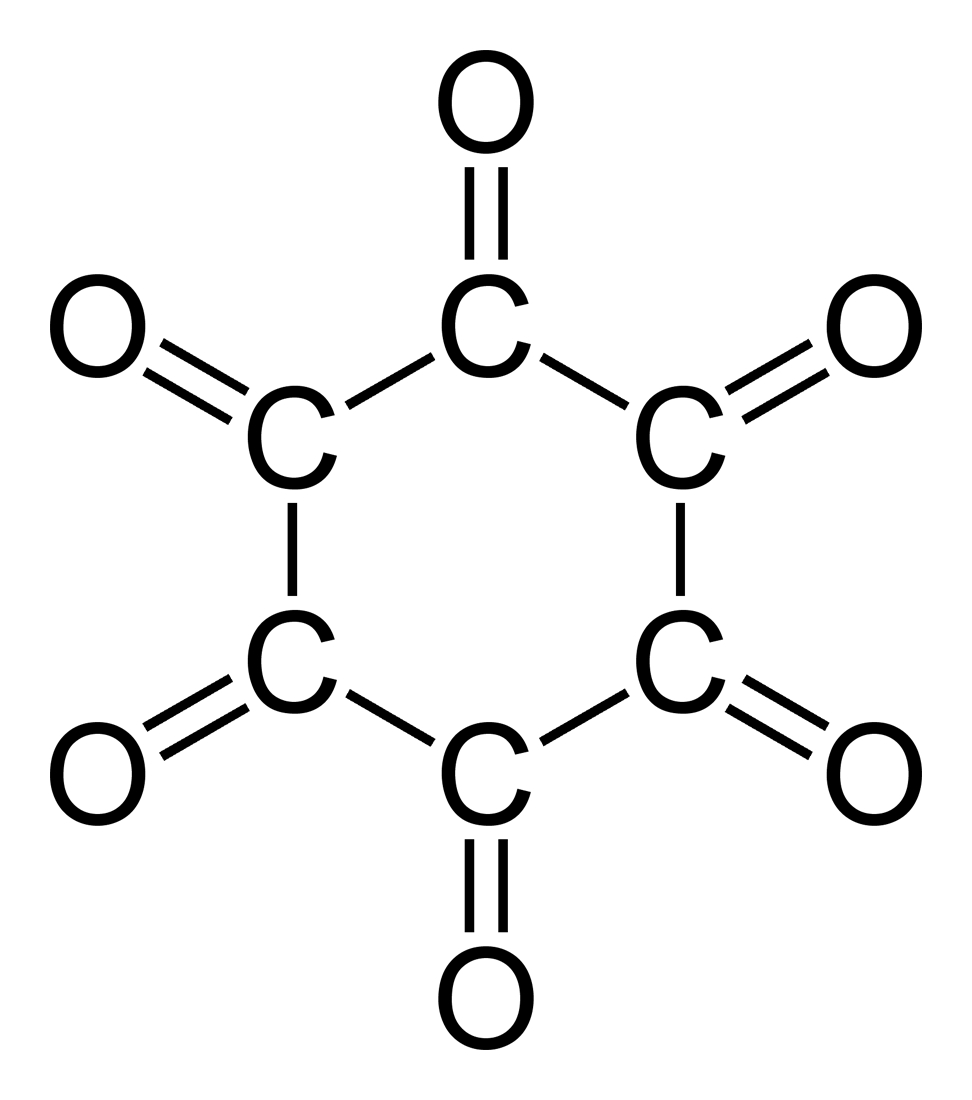

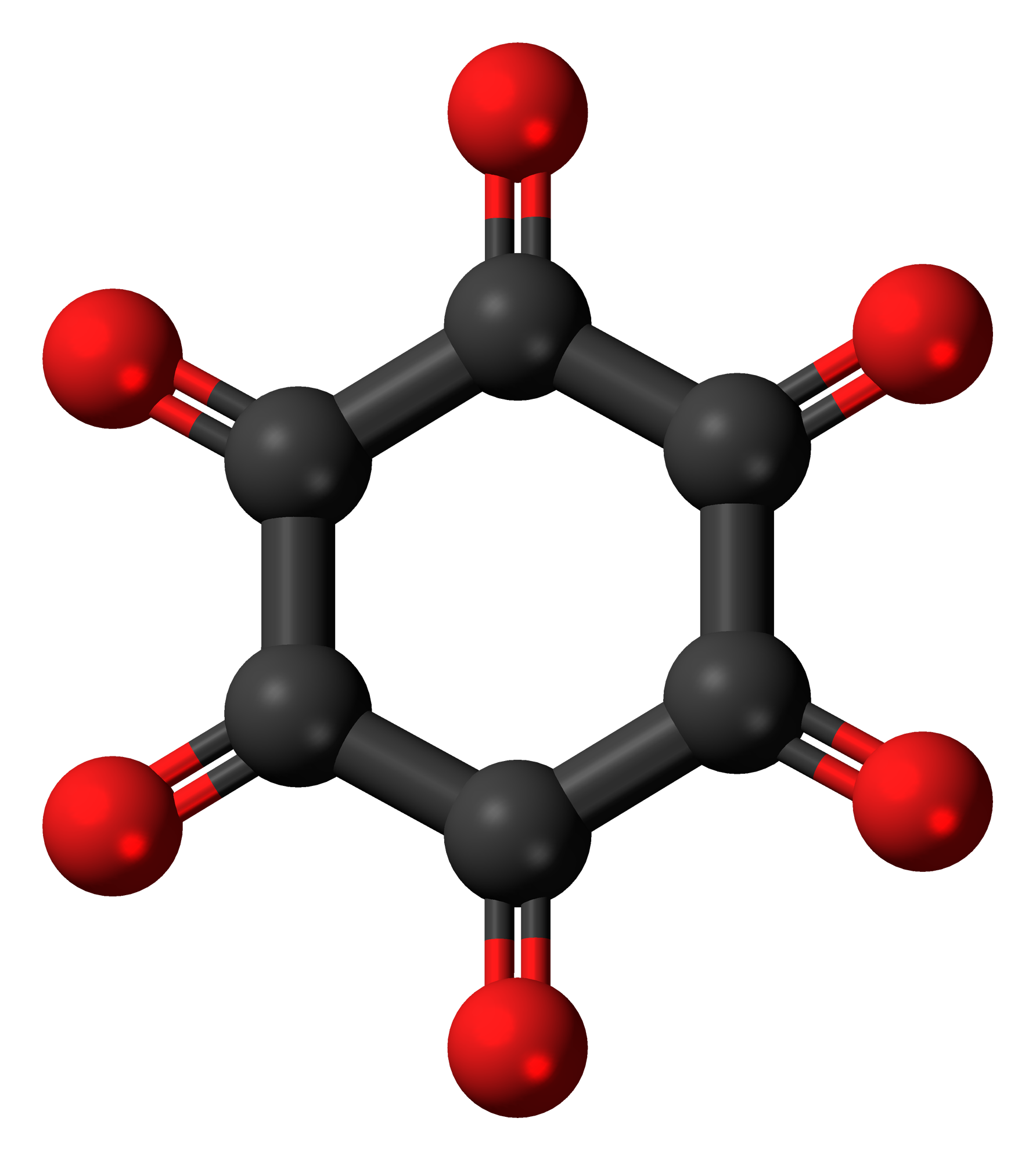

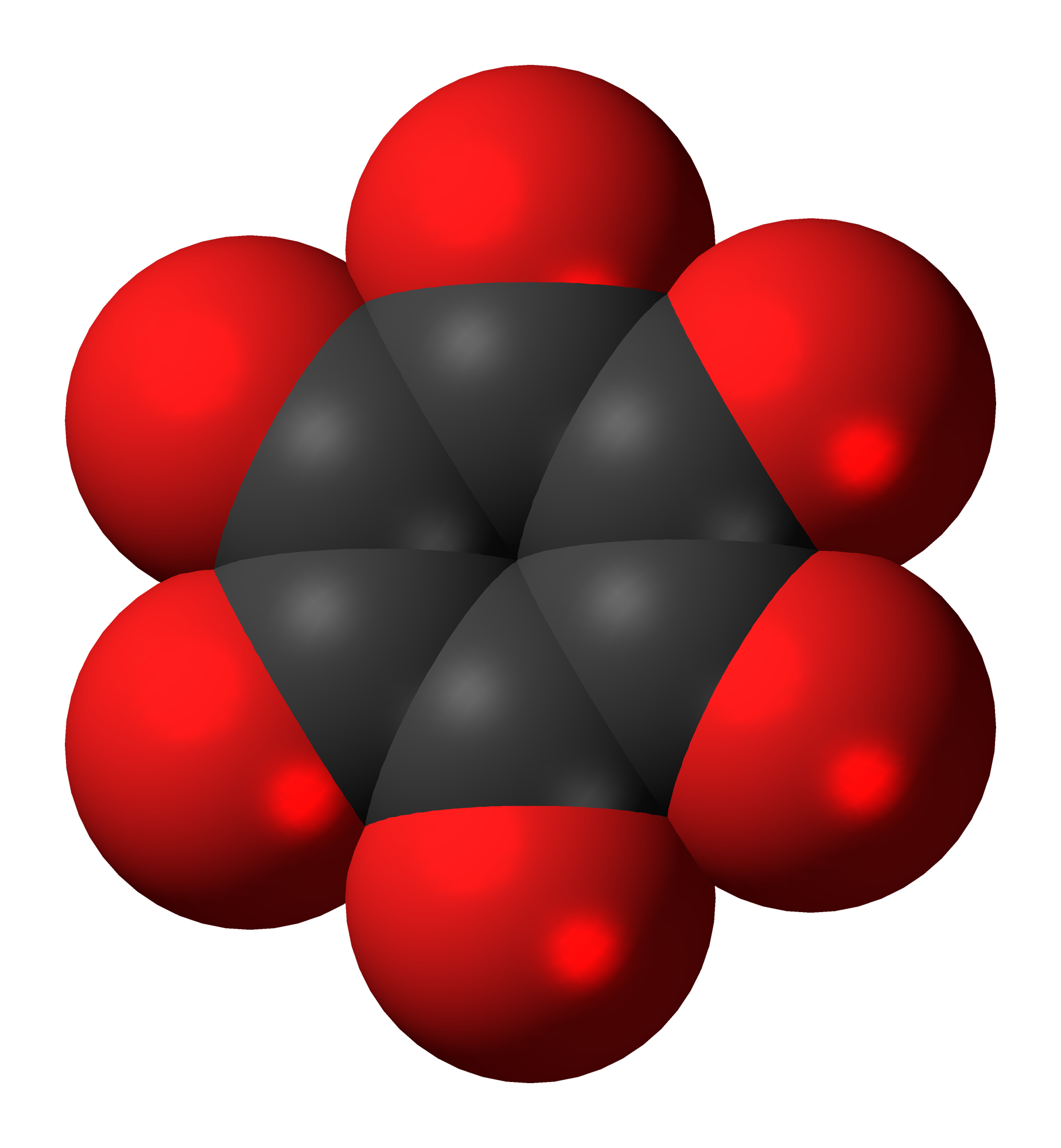

Names
- IUPAC name cyclohexane-1,2,3,4,5,6-hexone
- Other names hexaketocyclohexane, triquinoyl

Identifiers
CAS Number	527-31-1
3D model (JSmol)	Interactive image
ChemSpider	61541
ECHA InfoCard	100.007.649
PubChem CID	68240
UNII	7ZR8062LFD
CompTox Dashboard (EPA)	DTXSID80200662
- InChI: InChI=1S/C6O6/c7-1-2(8)4(10)6(12)5(11)3(1)9 Key: PKRGYJHUXHCUCN-UHFFFAOYSA-N; InChI=1/C6O6/c7-1-2(8)4(10)6(12)5(11)3(1)9 Key: PKRGYJHUXHCUCN-UHFFFAOYAM
- SMILES: O=C1C(=O)C(=O)C(=O)C(=O)C1=O

Properties
Chemical formula	C_{6}O_{6}
Molar mass	168.060 g·mol^{−1}
- Except where otherwise noted, data are given for materials in their standard state (at 25 °C [77 °F], 100 kPa). verify (what is ?) Infobox references

Cyclohexanehexone, also known as hexaketocyclohexane and triquinoyl, is an organic compound with formula C_{6}O_{6}, the sixfold ketone of cyclohexane. It is an oxide of carbon (an oxocarbon), a hexamer of carbon monoxide.

The compound is expected to be highly unstable, even less stable than the cyclohexanehexathione analog, and as of 1999 had only been observed as an ionized fragment during mass spectrometry studies.

== Related compounds ==
Cyclohexanehexone can be viewed as the neutral counterpart of the rhodizonate anion C_{6}O^{2−}_{6}. The singly charged anion C_{6}O^{−}_{6} has been detected in mass spectrometry experiments, formed by oligomerization of carbon monoxide through the formation of molybdenum carbonyls.

According to X-ray diffraction analysis, the reagent traded under the name "cyclohexanehexone octahydrate" or equivalent names is actually dodecahydroxycyclohexane dihydrate—the geminal diol derivative of the six ketone groups with an additional two molecules of water—a solid that decomposes at 95 °C.

In 1966, Howard E. Worne of Natick Chemical Industries patented compounds with formulas C_{10}O_{8} and C_{14}O_{10}, which can be described as the fusion of two or three molecules of C_{6}O_{6}, claimed to be produced by the action of ultraviolet radiation on a hot water solution of the parent compound.

== Triquinoyl therapy ==
In the late 1940s, William J. Hale claimed that "triquinoyl", being a trimer of William Frederick Koch's glyoxylide, should be just as effective as the latter against "diabetes, arthritis, poliomyelitis, and even cancer". Even though there is no research supporting this claim (and Koch's glyoxylide preparations were found to be just distilled water), triquinoyl is still listed as an ingredient of some alternative medicine remedies.

== See also ==
- Cyclopentanepentone
- Ethylenetetracarboxylic dianhydride, an isomer of C_{6}O_{6}.
- Cyclohexanehexathione, with same structure but with sulfur instead of oxygen.
