= Carboxylate =

Chemical group (RCOO); conjugate base of a carboxylic acid

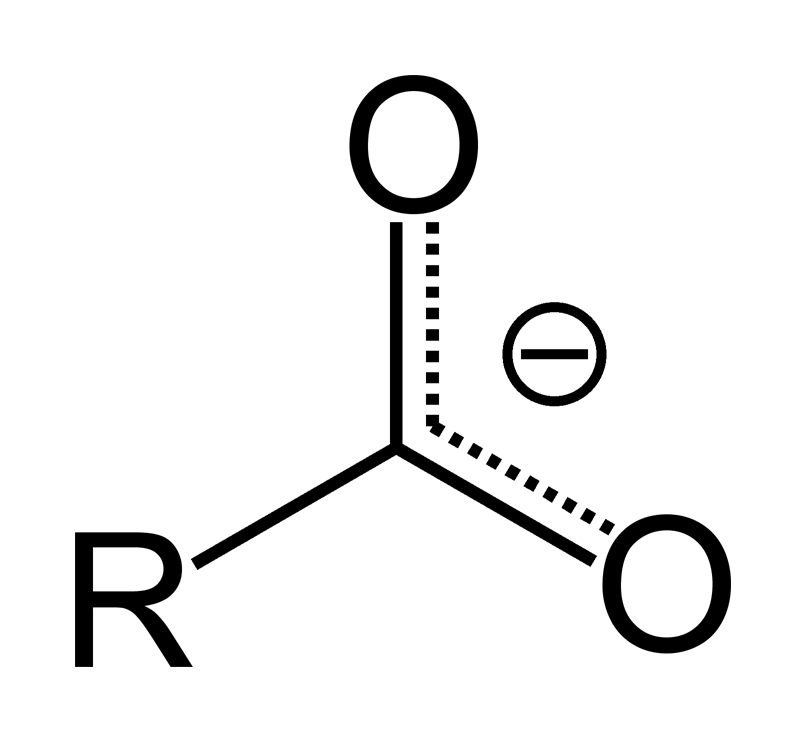
Carboxylate ion

In chemistry, a carboxylate is an anion with the general formula RCOO^{−} (or RCO^{−}_{2}). Carboxylate salts are salts that have the general formula M(RCOO)_{n}, where M is a metal and n is 1, 2,.... Carboxylate esters have the general formula RCOOR′ (also written as RCO_{2}R′), where R and R′ are organic groups.

== Occurrence and uses ==
Carboxylates are pervasive in nature, as all amino acids exist as such. The energy producing machinery supporting aerobic life - glycolysis and the Krebs citric acid cycle - relies heavily on carboxylates, e.g. pyruvate, citrate, and acetate. Even though they are often depicted as carboxylic acids, many vitamins function as carboxylates: vitamin B3 (niacin), vitamin B5 (pantothenic acid), vitamin B7 (biotin), etc.

In commercial settings, soaps are carboxylates.

== Formation ==
Carboxylates form by carboxylation reactions where carbon dioxide adds to a carbon nucleophile. In the laboratory, this process is illustrated by the conversion of Grignard reagents to carboxylates:

RMgX + CO_{2} → RCO_{2}MgX

In Nature, carboxylation is the first step in carbon fixation related to photosynthesis of organic matter. The importance of the process is indicated by the estimate that RuBisCo, the enzyme that catalyzes this reaction, is the most abundant protein.

Carboxylates form by deprotonation of carboxylic acids. Such acids typically have pK_{a} of less than 5, meaning that they convert to carboxylates in neutral water.

RCO_{2}H + NaOH → RCO_{2}Na + H_{2}O

Because of their tendency to form hydrogen bonds, carboxylic acids characteristically undergo "half deprotonations":

2 RCO_{2}H + NaOH → Na^{+}[RCO_{2}]_{2}H^{−} + H_{2}O

This tendency (homoassociation) complicates the interpretation of the pKa's of carboxylic acids, especially in nonpolar solvents that weakly solvate carboxylate anions.

Carboxylates arise by many other routes, such as the base hydrolysis (saponification) of esters:

RCO_{2}R' + NaOH → RCO_{2}Na + R'OH

Carboxylates arise by the base hydrolysis of anhydrides and related species:

(RCO)_{2}O + 2 NaOH → 2 RCO_{2}Na + H_{2}O

In the Cannizzaro reaction, strong base induces disproportionation of certain (nonenolizable) aldehydes, leading to carboxylates.

== Structure and bonding ==
The C-CO_{2} portion of carboxylate anions is planar. According to X-ray crystallography, the two C-O distances are equal or nearly so. In tetrabutylammonium acetate, the C-O distances are both 125 picometers. By contrast, the C=O and C-O bonds in carboxylic acids and carboxylic esters are localized, as reflected in bond distances that differ by >10 pm.

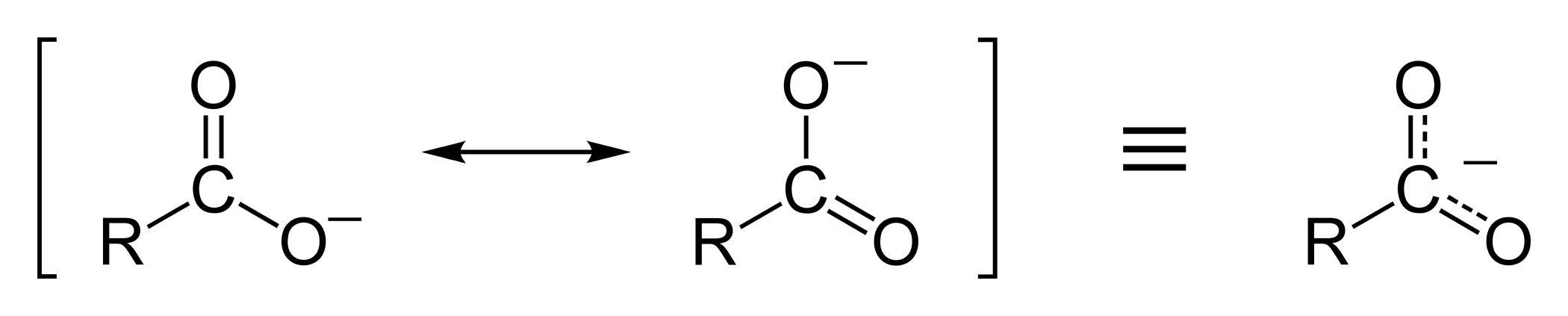

The infrared spectrum of carboxylates is diagnostic of the partial multiple bond between carbon and oxygen. For acetate, ν_{CO} (the C-O "stretching modes") = 1578 and 1414 cm^{−1}. Esters, which have a localized C=O center, absorb near 1740 cm^{−1} and ethers, which have carbon-oxygen single bonds, absorb near 1100 cm^{−1}.

== Reactions ==
=== Lewis basicity ===
Carboxylate anions are Lewis bases, forming a variety of adducts. One class of such derivatives are transition metal carboxylate complexes.

=== Deprotonation ===
Carboxylic acid salts with a hydrogen atom in the alpha position can be deprotonated with strong bases like lithium diisopropylamide:

RCH_{2}COO^{−} + LiN(CH(CH_{3})_{2})_{2} → RCHLiCOO^{−} + HN(CH(CH_{3})_{2})_{2}

The resulting organolithium compound can be then C-alkylated:

RCHLiCOO^{−} + R'X → RR'CHCOO^{−} + LiX

=== Nucleophilic substitution ===
Carboxylate ions react with alkyl halides to form esters:

RCO^{−}_{2} + R'X → RCO_{2}R' + X^{−}

This route to esters complements the conventional Fischer esterification.

=== Reduction ===
Carboxylate salts are less easily reduced than esters, but the reduction can be achieved with lithium aluminium hydride.

== Examples ==
This list is for cases where there is a separate article for the anion or its derivatives. All other organic acids should be found at their parent carboxylic acid.

- Formate ion, HCOO^{−}
- Acetate ion, CH_{3}COO^{−}
- Methanetetracarboxylate ion, C(COO^{−})_{4}
- Oxalate ion, (COO)^{2−}_{2}
