= Heterocumulene =

A heterocumulene is a molecule or ion containing a chain of at least three double bonds between consecutive atoms, in which one or more atoms in the doubly bonded chain is a heteroatom. Such species are analogous to a cumulene in which the chain of doubly bonded atoms contains only carbon, except that at least one carbon is replaced by a heteroatom. Some authors relax the definition to include species with chains of only two double bonds between consecutive atoms, also known as heteroallenes.

Because of the double bond rule, heterocumulenes are rarely isolated. Instead they tend to polymerize. Many are however common in the interstellar medium, where they exist as a dilute gas. Most of the longer ones are very unstable and reactive, and thus have a transient existence, or can only survive when dilute or in an inert matrix. Molecular clouds in space are very dilute and allow heterocumulenes to exist long enough to be detected. Some simple heterocumulenes are common chemicals or ions. These include carbon dioxide, carbon disulfide, carbon diselenide, cyanate, and thiocyanate. Some definitions of heterocumulenes include compounds that contain concatenated double bonds with more than one element, but may have other parts to them. This class includes ketene, sulfur diimide, sulfine, and dicyclohexylcarbodiimide. Some heterocumulenes can act as ligands with various metals.

== Reactions ==
Some energised heterocumulenes can cyclise by bending into a circle and bonding the two ends of the chain. Molecules that can do this are CCCB, CCCAl, CCCSi, CCCN, and CCCP.

Other four-atom heterocumulenes include CCBO, tricarbon monoxide (CCCO), and CCCS.

Four-atom heterocumulenes when cyclised can have two forms. In the kite (or rhombic) form, a triangle of carbon has two of its atoms bonded to the heteroatom. In the fan form the hetero atom links to three carbon atoms arranged in a fan shape. CCCSi has linear, rhombic or fan isomers. The rhombic form is known in space near the carbon star IRC+10216.

CCCCO cyclises to a three-member ring. CCCCN undergoes an isonitrile conversion.

== Molecules ==
Other known five-atom heterocumulenes include CCBCC, CCCCB, CCOCC, CCCCSi, CNCCO, HCCCO, HCCCS, and NCCCN. CCCCSi is known as a linear molecule in space.

CCCCBO turns into a six-member ring. Other six atom heterocumulenes include OCCCCN and HCNCNH.

Seven atom heterocumulenes include NCCCCCN, HCCBCCH.

A known nine atom heterocumulene is HCCCCCCCH.

Thiocumulenes have a sulfur atom. They include dicarbon monosulfide CCS and tricarbon monosulfide CCCS, both known from molecular clouds. SC_{n}S chains can be made by laser ablation with n up to 27.

=== Table of molecules ===
This table lists heterocumulene molecules. Heterocumulenes are supposed to be straight, but some combinations of elements result in bent or cyclic molecules.

Heteroallenes and heterocumulenes with one kind of heteroatom
Heteroatom	1 carbon	2 carbons	3 carbons	4+ carbons
Boron	—N/a	CCB	—N/a	CCBCC, CCCCB
Nitrogen	-N=C=N-, >C=N^{+}=N^{−}	>C=C=N-, >C=N^{+}=C<, CCN	CCCN, NCCCN	NCCCCCN, C_{n}N (n=4,5)
Oxygen	OCO	>C=C=O, CCO, OCCO	>C=C=C=O, CCCO, OCCCO	C_{n}O (n=4,6,8), OC_{n}O (n=4,5)
Silicon	Si=C=Si (bent)	CCSi (bent), >C=C=Si	CCCSi (ring)	C_{n}Si (n=4,6)
Phosphorus	R_{3}P=C=PR_{3} (bent)	>C=C=P-, CCP	—N/a	—N/a
Sulfur	SCS, >C=S=S (bent)	>C=C=S, CCS, SCCS, >C=S=C<	CCCS, SCCCS	C_{n}S (n=4,5,6), SC_{n}S (n=4,5,7,9)
Chlorine	—N/a	CCCl	CCCCl (bent)	—N/a
Selenium	CSe_{2}	—N/a	SeCCCSe	—N/a
Transition metals	—N/a	>C=C=[M]	IrC_{3}^{–}, PtC_{3}, AuC_{3}^{+}	—N/a

Heteroallenes and heterocumulenes with two different kinds of heteroatoms
atom 1	H	N	O	S
N	HCNCC, HCCNC		-OCN, -NCO, >C=N^{+}=CO	-SNC, -NCS, >C=N^{+}=C=S
S	HC_{2-8}S (HCS bent)	NCS (NCCS bent), NC_{3-7}S	OCS, -C=S=O	>C=S=N-
Se		-SeCN	OCSe	SCSe

== See also ==
- Carbon dichalcogenide
- Cyanopolyyne
