= Tricarbon monoxide =

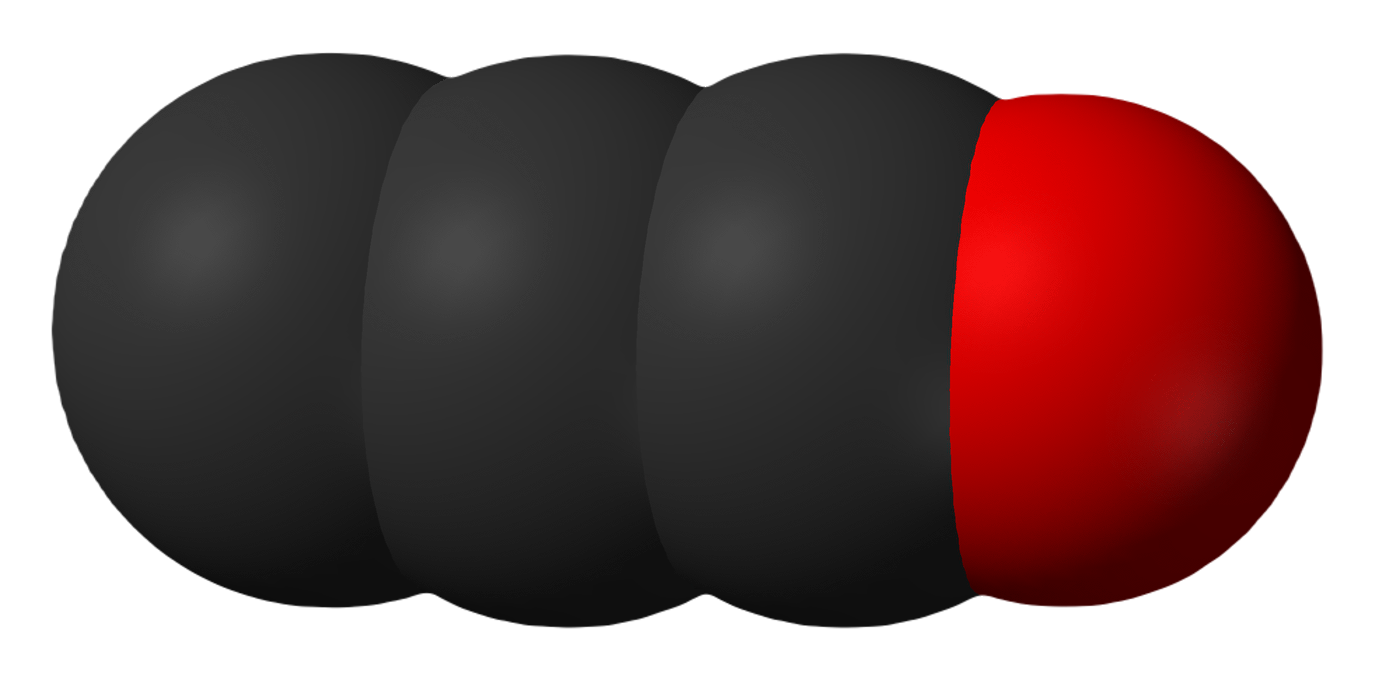

Names
- Preferred IUPAC name 3-Oxopropa-1,2-dien-1-ylidene
- Other names 3-Oxopropadienylidene

Identifiers
CAS Number	11127-17-6
3D model (JSmol)	Interactive image
PubChem CID	101860484
CompTox Dashboard (EPA)	DTXSID301336916
- InChI: InChI=1S/C3O/c1-2-3-4 Key: ZCNKODXATWVMAO-UHFFFAOYSA-N
- SMILES: [C-]#CC#[O+]

Properties
Chemical formula	C_{3}O
Molar mass	52.032 g·mol^{−1}
Appearance	Gas

Related compounds
Related oxides	carbon monoxide dicarbon monoxide tetracarbon monoxide
Related compounds	tricarbon monosulfide carbon subnitride HCCCO; Tricarbon telluride
- Except where otherwise noted, data are given for materials in their standard state (at 25 °C [77 °F], 100 kPa). Infobox references

Tricarbon monoxide (C_{3}O) is a reactive radical oxocarbon molecule found in space, and which can be made as a transient substance in the laboratory. It can be trapped in an inert gas matrix or made as a short lived gas. C_{3}O can be classified as a ketene or an oxocumulene, a kind of heterocumulene.

== Natural occurrence ==
C_{3}O has been detected by its microwave spectrum in the dark cold Taurus Molecular Cloud One and also in the protostar Elias 18.

The route to produce this is speculated to be:

HC^{+}_{3} + CO_{2} → HC_{3}O^{+} + CO
HC_{3}O^{+} → C_{3}O + H^{+}

or

C_{2} + CO → C_{3}O which is more favourable at lower temperatures.

The related C_{3}S is more abundant in dark molecular clouds, even though oxygen is 20 times more common than sulfur. The difference is due to the higher rate of formation and that C_{3}S is less polar.

== Production ==
C_{3}O can be produced by heating Meldrum's acid. This also produces acetone, carbon monoxide and carbon dioxide.

R. L. DeKock and W. Waltner were the first to identify C_{3}O by reacting atomic carbon with carbon monoxide in an argon matrix. They observed an infrared absorption line at 2241 cm^{−1}. They produced carbon atoms by heating graphite inside a thin tantalum tube.

M. E. Jacox photolysed C_{3}O_{2} in an argon matrix to produce C_{3}O with an IR absorption line at 2244 cm^{−1}, however he did not recognise what was produced.

By heating diazocyclopentanetrione or a similar acid anhydride, (2,4-azo-3-oxo-dipentanoic anhydride), C_{3}O is produced. Also the action of light on tetracarbon dioxide yields C_{3}O and CO.

Heating fumaryl chloride also yields C_{3}O. Heating Lead 2,4-dinitroresorcinate also produces C_{3}O along with C_{2}O, CO and carbon suboxide. An electric discharge in carbon suboxide produces about 11 ppm C_{3}O.

Roger Brown heated 3,5-dimethyl-1-propynoylpyrazole to over 700 °C to make C_{3}O. Also pyrolysis of 5,5'-bis(2,2-dimethyl-4,6-dioxo-1,3-dioxanylidene or di-isopropylidene ethylenetetracarboxylate yields C_{3}O.

Irradiating carbon monoxide ice with electrons yields a mixture of carbon oxides, including C_{3}O. This process could happen on icy bodies in space.

Irradiating cyclopropenone with vacuum ultraviolet while frozen in a neon matrix causes dehydrogenation to form CCCO. Hydrogen can then react again to yield isomers propynal and propadienone.

== Reactions ==
C_{3}O can be stabilised as a ligand in the pentacarbonyls of group 6 elements as in Cr(CO)_{5}CCCO. This is formed from [n-Bu_{4}N][CrI(CO)_{5}] and the silver acetylide derivative of sodium propiolate (AgC≡CCOONa), and then thiophosgene. AgC≡CCOONa in turn is made from silver ions and sodium propiolate. The blue black solid complex is called pentacarbonyl(3-oxopropadienylidene)chromium(0). It is quite volatile and decomposes at 32 °C. Its infrared spectrum shows a band at 2028 cm^{−1} due to CCCO. The complex can dissolve in hexane, however it slowly decomposes, losing dicarbon (C_{2}) which goes on to form acetylenes and cumulenes in the solvent. Dimethyl sulfoxide oxidises the CCCO ligand to carbon suboxide.

C_{3}O deposits a reddish-black film on glass.

The reaction of C_{3}O and urea is predicted to form uracil. The pathway for this, is that firstly the two molecules react to form isocyanuric acid and propiolamide, the NH then reacts to bond with the triple bond, with the NH_{2} group moving back. Then a final cyclisation occurs to make uracil.

== Properties ==
The C_{3}O molecules do not last long. At the low pressure of 1 pascal, they survive about one second. The force constants for the bonds are: C1-O 14.94, C1-C2 1.39 C2-C3 6.02 mdyn/Å. The bond lengths are C-O 1.149, C1-C2 1.300, C2-C3 1.273 Å. The molecule is linear.

bond	atom 1	atom 2	length Å	force constant mdyn/Å	IR bands cm^{−1}
CCC-O	C1	O	1.149	14.94	
CC-CO	C2	C1	1.300	1.39	
C-CCCO	C3	C2	1.273	6.02	

Proton affinity is 885 kJmol^{−1}. The dipole moment is 2.391 D. The oxygen end has a positive charge, and the carbon end the negative charge. The molecule behaves as if there are triple bonds at each end, and a single bond in the middle. This is isoelectronic to cyanogen.

Molecular constants used in determining the microwave spectrum are rotational constant B_{0}=4810.8862 MHz centrifugal distortion constant D_{0}=0.00077 MHz. Known microwave spectral lines vary from 9621.76 for J=1←0 to 182792.35 MHz for J=19←18.
