= Tetracarbon dioxide =

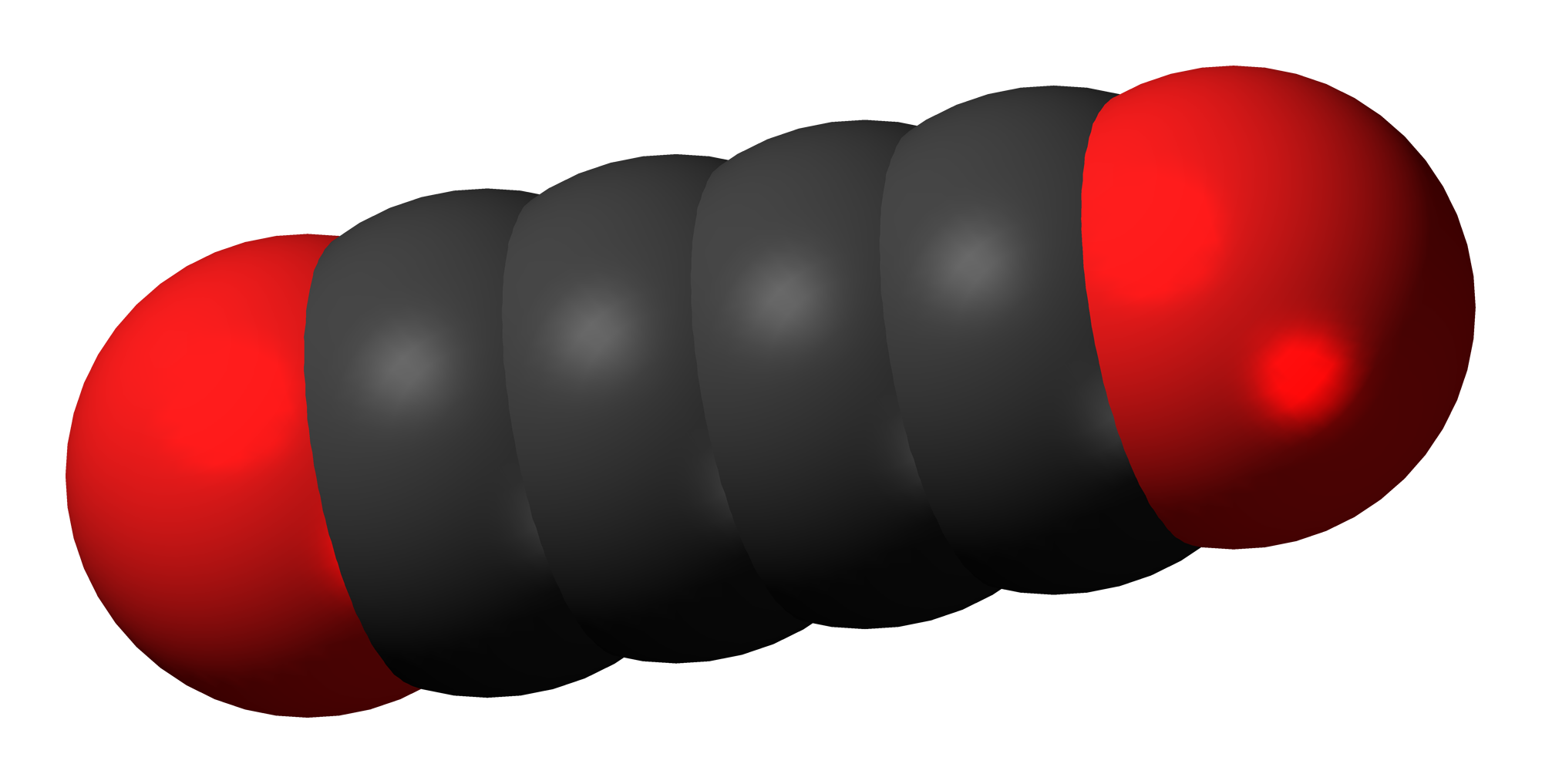

Names
- Preferred IUPAC name Buta-1,2,3-triene-1,4-dione

Identifiers
CAS Number	51799-35-0
3D model (JSmol)	Interactive image
ChemSpider	19001756
PubChem CID	15039474
CompTox Dashboard (EPA)	DTXSID60567361
- InChI: InChI=1S/C4O2/c5-3-1-2-4-6 Key: QIQCZROILFZKAT-UHFFFAOYSA-N
- SMILES: O=C=C=C=C=O

Properties
Chemical formula	C_{4}O_{2}
Molar mass	80.042
- Except where otherwise noted, data are given for materials in their standard state (at 25 °C [77 °F], 100 kPa). verify (what is ?) Infobox references

Tetracarbon dioxide is an oxide of carbon, a chemical compound of carbon and oxygen, with chemical formula C_{4}O_{2} or O=C=C=C=C=O. It can be regarded as butatriene dione, the double ketone of butatriene — more precisely 1,2,3-butatriene-1,4-dione.

Butatriene dione is the fourth member of the family of linear carbon dioxides O(=C)_{n}=O, that includes carbon dioxide CO_{2} or O=C=O, ethylene dione C_{2}O_{2} or O=C=C=O, carbon suboxide C_{3}O_{2} or O=C=C=C=O, pentacarbon dioxide C_{5}O_{2} or O=C=C=C=C=C=O, and so on.

The compound was obtained in 1990 by Günther Maier and others, by flash vacuum pyrolysis of cyclic azaketones in a frozen argon matrix. It was also obtained in the same year by Detlev Sülzle and Helmut Schwartz through impact ionization of ((CH_{3}-)_{2}(C_{4}O_{2})(=O)_{2}=)_{2} in the gas phase. Although theoretical studies indicated that the even-numbered members of the O(=C)_{n}=O family should be inherently unstable, C_{4}O_{2} is indefinitely stable in the matrix, but is decomposed by light into tricarbon monoxide C_{3}O and carbon monoxide CO. It has a triplet ground state.
