= IRAS F13342+3932 =

Galaxy in the constellation Canes Venatici

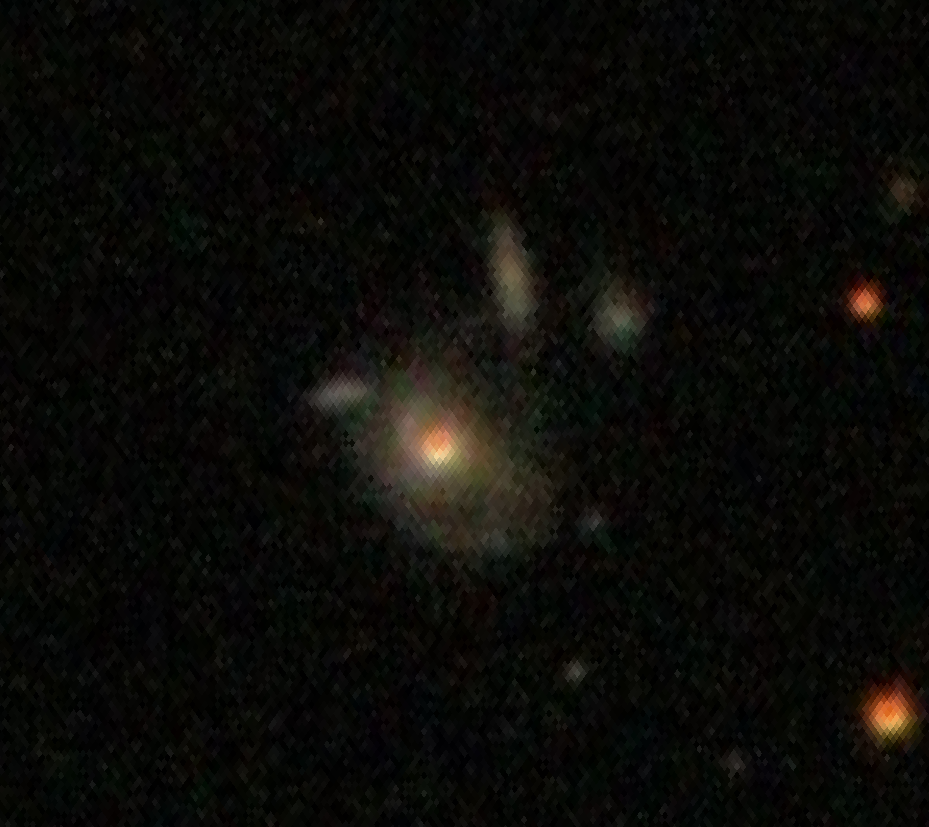
- SDSS image of IRAS F13342+3932

Observation data (J2000.0 epoch)
- Constellation: Canes Venatici
- Right ascension: 13^{h} 36^{m} 24.05^{s}
- Declination: +39° 17′ 31.13″
- Redshift: 0.179050
- Heliocentric radial velocity: 53,678 ± 8 km/s
- Distance: 2,585.5 ± 181.0 Mly (792.71 ± 55.49 Mpc)
- magnitude (J): 14.53
- magnitude (H): 13.63

Characteristics
- Type: ULIRG Sy1
- Size: ~485,000 ly (148.8 kpc) (estimated)

Other designations
- 2MASX J13362406+3917305, IRAS 13342+3932, NVSS J133623+391733, LQAC 204+039 002, LEDA 84036

IRAS F13342+3932 is an ultraluminous infrared galaxy located in the constellation of Canes Venatici. The redshift of the galaxy is (z) 0.179 and it was first discovered by astronomers from a sample of IRAS catalogue sources in April 1986 and such has a faint companion. It is categorized as a broad-line Type 1 Seyfert galaxy.

== Description ==
IRAS F13342+3932 is classified as a quasar. When observed with Hubble Space Telescope (HST), its host galaxy is found to contain at least two spiral arms. The mass of the central supermassive black hole is estimated to be 9.12^{+0.5}_{−0.5} M_{☉} and the total bolometric luminosity of the entire galaxy is estimated as 12.49 L_{☉}. Observations in 2019 has found the host galaxy has H II regions with smaller photoionized regions of both AGN and LINER type. It is also evident there are presence of massive young OB stars located with the star forming regions of the host galaxy which in turn, is photoionizing the surrounding interstellar gas. The radio structure of the galaxy is compact with a resolved radio core based on Very Large Array (VLA) imaging. The core is estimated to have a radio power of 22.73 watts per hertz.

It is found that the galaxy contains molecular gas outflows. When observed, the velocity field of the gas is mainly traced by emission lines, with the field itself being rotation dominated. Carbon oxide mapping observations also showed the optical spectrum of the galaxy has a line profile, described as triple-peaked. Evidence also found the blue and red peaks of the profile are emitted out from both regions located in the northeast and southwest while the central peak on the other hand, is shown originating from central and southeast regions. A hydrogen gas mass of 2 × 10^{8} M_{☉} has been estimated for the entire galaxy, with the gas reaching hot temperatures of 1400 ± 60 Kelvin. The molecular mass of the galaxy is calculated as 3 ± 2 × 10^{6} M_{☉}.
