= CCCS =

CCCS may refer to:

- Canadian Centre for Cyber Security
- Centre for Contemporary Cultural Studies, a research centre at the University of Birmingham, England
- Christ Church Cathedral School
- Christian Congregational Church of Samoa
- Command, control and coordination system, in military jargon
- Consumer Credit Counselling Service, a registered charity in the United Kingdom
- California Community Colleges System
- Colorado Community College System
- Competition and Consumer Commission of Singapore
- Tricarbon monosulfide when represented as its chemical structure
