= HS 0810+2554 =

Quasar in the constellation of Cancer

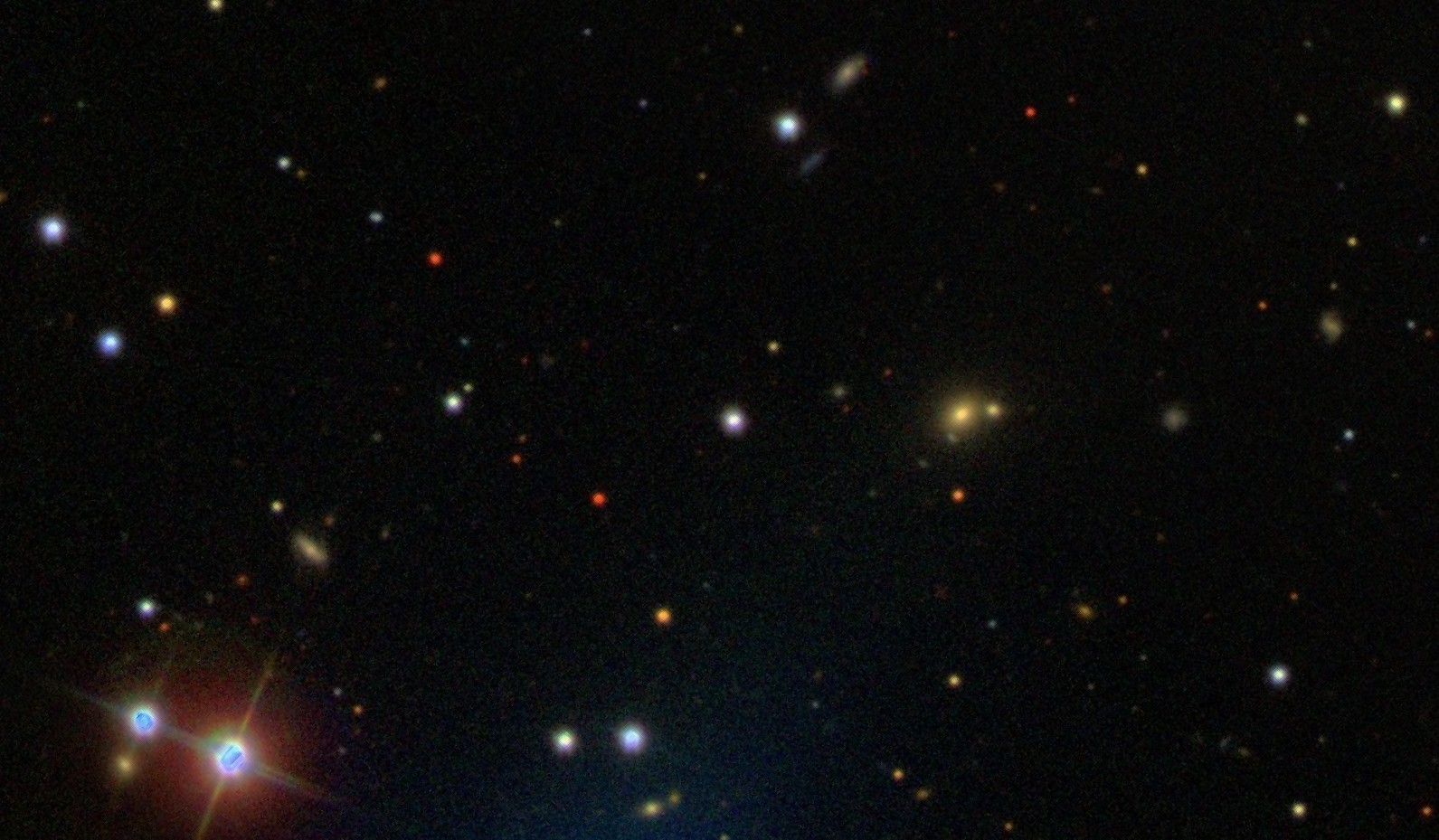
- The quasar HS 0810+2554.

Observation data (J2000.0 epoch)
- Constellation: Cancer
- Right ascension: 08^{h} 13^{m} 31.28^{s}
- Declination: +25° 45′ 03.14″
- Redshift: 1.509866
- Heliocentric radial velocity: 452,646 km/s
- Distance: 9.549 Gly
- Apparent magnitude (V): 16.18
- Apparent magnitude (B): 16.58

Characteristics
- Type: QSO

Other designations
- IRAS F08105+2554, 2MASS J08133129+2545031, SDSS J081331.28+254503.0, 2CXO J081331.2+254502, 1RXS J081332.0+254444

HS 0810+2554 is a gravitationally-lensed quasar located in the northern constellation of Cancer. it has a redshift of (z) 1.50 and it was first discovered in 2002 by astronomers led by D. Reimers who described it as a bright twin object to PG 1115+080. This object has been classified as a narrow absorption-line radio-quiet quasar.

== Description ==
HS 0810+2554 is a quadruply imaged lensed quasar. When imaged, the lens of the object is found separated into four components made up of two close paired bright images labeled A and B described as merging, and two other faint images labeled as C and D. When imaged using infrared imaging at high resolution, the A and B components displayed flux ratio trends which ranged from 1.79 to 1.23 at wavelengths and in micrometer range from 2.16 right up to 4.78. The time-delay for both components has been estimated as 0.05 days via a free-form lens modelling software, making it the shortest detected. The lens galaxy of HS 0810+2554 is located at an unknown redshift although A.M. Mosquera and C.S. Kochanek calculated the redshift as 0.89.

The star-formation rate of HS 0810+2554 is estimated to be 4.0 M_{☉} per year, with an infrared luminosity of 13.5 L_{☉} based on a Spectral and Photometric Imaging REceiver (SPIRE) instrument aboard the Herschel Space Observatory. In addition, the quasar is undergoing powerful relativistic outflows with an outflow rate of Ṁ 1.5–3.4 M_{☉} per year, driven by acceleration of X-ray winds by magnetic driving, based on X-ray observations with Chandra X-ray Observatory and XMM Newton. X-ray absorption lines have also been discovered in the quasar's spectrum at high energies, with blueshifted carbon oxide and nitrogen spectra lines reaching implied velocities of 19,400 and 1,046 kilometers per seconds respectively.

A carbon monoxide (3–2) line profile was discovered in the host galaxy of HS 0810+2554 with a full width at half maximum of 380 ± 10 kilometer per seconds with its emission peak shifted as -465 ± kilometers per year. The host galaxy also has a carbon oxide molecular gas reservoir found rotating in a circular disk, with a gas mass of (5.2 ± 1.5)/_{ɥ32} × 10^{10} M_{☉} based on a study published in 2020.

HS 0810+2554 has an extended source with a faint arc shown as visible around the two close components. Radio observations by MERLIN and European Very Long Baseline Interferometry in 2019, revealed jet activity in HS 0810+2554. The quasar displays a radio core and two components on the opposite side of the core described as radio jets, implying a compact symmetrical object (CSO) morphology.
