= Cyclopropanetrione =

Names
- IUPAC name cyclopropane-1,2,3-trione

Identifiers
| CAS Number | 76719-55-6 |
| 3D model (JSmol) | Interactive image |
| ChemSpider | 35786973 |
| PubChem CID | 58556001 |
| CompTox Dashboard (EPA) | DTXSID50729390 |
- InChI: InChI=1S/C3O3/c4-1-2(5)3(1)6 Key: RONYDRNIQQTADL-UHFFFAOYSA-N; InChI=1/C3O3/c4-1-2(5)3(1)6 Key: RONYDRNIQQTADL-UHFFFAOYAP
- SMILES: O=C1C(=O)C1=O

Properties
| Chemical formula | C_{3}O_{3} |
| Molar mass | 84.030 g·mol^{−1} |

Related compounds
| Related compounds | deltic acid oxopropandial |
- Except where otherwise noted, data are given for materials in their standard state (at 25 °C [77 °F], 100 kPa). Infobox references

Cyclopropanetrione or trioxocyclopropane is a little-known oxide of carbon with formula C_{3}O_{3}. It consists of a ring of three carbon atoms each attached to an oxygen atom with a double bond. Alternately, it can be thought as a trimer of carbon monoxide. This compound is predicted to be thermodynamically unstable, dissociating to carbon monoxide, and has not been produced in bulk. However, C_{3}O_{3} molecules, provisionally assigned to either cyclopropanetrione or its open-chain analog •(CO)_{3}•, have been detected using mass spectrometry.

It is the neutral equivalent of the deltate anion C_{3}O_{3}^{2−}, known since 1975. An equivalent hydrate hexahydroxycyclopropane or cyclopropane-1,1,2,2,3,3-hexol, (-C(OH)_{2}-)_{3} also exists. This contains geminal hydroxy groups.
