= Thioxoethenylidene =

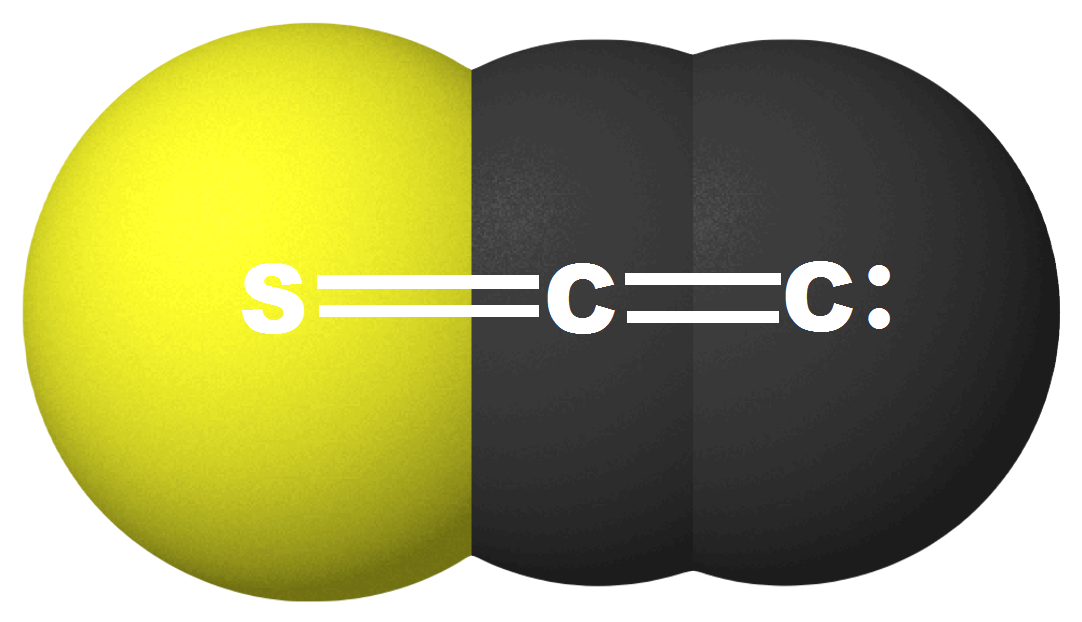

Names
- IUPAC name Thioxoethenylidene

Identifiers
3D model (JSmol)	Interactive image
ChemSpider	10800798
PubChem CID	101170561
CompTox Dashboard (EPA)	DTXSID901337205
- InChI: InChI=1S/C2S/c1-2-3 Key: NELREAXCVQVNGC-UHFFFAOYSA-N
- SMILES: [C+]#C[S-]

Properties
Chemical formula	C_{2}S
Molar mass	56.08 g·mol^{−1}

Related compounds
Related compounds	CS; SCCS; SCCCS
- Except where otherwise noted, data are given for materials in their standard state (at 25 °C [77 °F], 100 kPa). Infobox references

Thioxoethenylidene, is a reactive heteroallene molecule with formula CCS.

== Occurrence ==
CCS is found in space in large quantities. This includes the Taurus Molecular Cloud in TMC-1, TMC-1c and L1521B. These are likely in young starless molecular cloud cores.

== Production ==
By condensing propadienedithione SCCCS or thioxopropadienone OCCCS in solid argon and irradiating with ultraviolet radiation, CCS is formed. Another way is via a glow discharge in a mixture of carbon disulfide and helium. Yet another way is through electron irradiation of sulfur containing heterocycles.

CCS and the anion CCS^{−} can be formed in solid neon matrices also.

== Properties ==
CCS can be a ligand. It can form an asymmetrical bridge between two molybdenum atoms in Mo2(μ,σ(C):η^{2}(C′S)-CCS)(CO)_{4}(hydrotris(3,5-dimethylpyrazol-1-yl)borate)_{2} In this one carbon atom has a triple bond to a molybdenum and the other has a double bond to the other molybdenum atom, which also has a single bond to the sulfur atom.

The ultraviolet spectrum shows absorption bands between 2800 and 3370 Å and also in the near infrared between 7500 and 10000 Å. CCS can react with CCCS to form C_{5}S.

The infrared spectrum in solid argon shows a vibration band at 1666.6 cm^{−1} called v_{1} and another called v_{2} at 862.7 cm^{−1}. The 2v_{1} overtone is at 3311.1 cm^{−1}. A combination vibration and bending band is at 2763.4 cm^{−1}

The microwave spectrum has emission lines 4_{3} − 3_{2} at 45.4 GHz and 2_{1} - 1_{0} at 22.3 GHz, important for detection of molecules in molecular clouds.

Theoretical predictions show that the C-C bond is 1.304 Å long and the C–S bond is 1.550 Å.
