= Thioketene =

Organic compounds with the structure >C=C=S

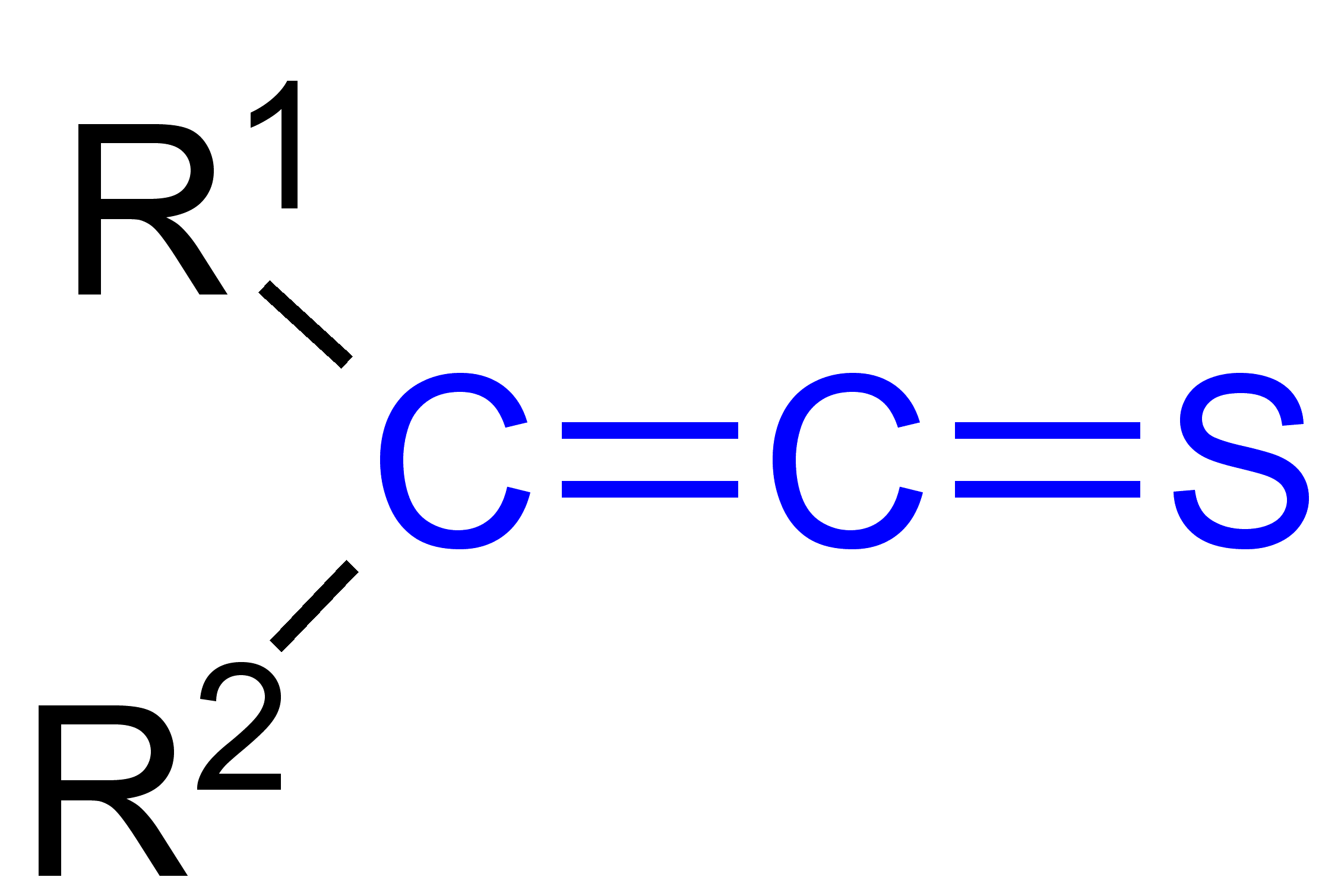
The general structure of thioketenes

In organic chemistry, thioketenes are organosulfur compounds analogous to ketenes with the general formula R_{2}C=C=S, where R is alkyl or aryl. The parent thioketene (ethenethione) has the formula CH_{2}=C=S. It is the simplest thioketene. Ethenethione is stable as a gas, but like most thioketenes, it polymerizes upon condensation.

== Synthesis ==
Thioketones may be prepared by treatment of acid chlorides with phosphorus pentasulfide as described by the following idealized equation:

RR'CHC(O)Cl + P_{4}S_{10} → RR'C=C=S + HCl + "P_{4}S_{9}O"

Some thioketenes are produced as transient species upon pyrolysis of 1,2,3-thiadiazoles. Elimination from α-chloroalkenyl thiolates RR'C=C(Cl)S^{−} also yields thioketenes. These intermediates are believed to be responsible for the cytotoxicity and mutagenicity of trichloroethylene, as well as certain other polyhalogenated alkenes, with toxication occurring via conjugation with glutathione.

== Isolable thioketenes ==
Thioketenes can be stabilized by either steric protection or by electronic effects. Thus, di-tert-butyl thioketene is easily isolated and air-stable. Several examples have been characterized by X-ray crystallography. The C=S distance is 157 pm and the C=C distance is 124 pm, both bonds being suitable for the C=C=S assignment. The violet color characteristic of thioketenes indicates the small HOMO–LUMO gap.

Bis(trifluoromethyl)thioketene ((CF_{3})_{2}C=C=S) is an example of an electronically stabilized thioketene.

== Reactions ==
Thioketenes are electrophilic. They add amines to give thioamides:

R_{2}C=C=S + HNR'_{2} → R_{2}CH−C(S)−NR'_{2}

With peroxyacids, they produce thioketene-S-oxides:

R_{2}C=C=S + R'CO_{3}H → R_{2}C=C=S=O + R'CO_{2}H

Thioketenes bind to metal carbonyls giving adducts.

== Related compounds ==
- carbon subsulfide (S=C=C=C=S).
