= William Frederick Koch =

U.S. medical doctor and pharmaceutical entrepreneur

William Frederick Koch (1885–1967) was a U.S. medical doctor and pharmaceutical entrepreneur. In the 1940s he marketed glyoxylide, a drug which he claimed would cure cancer. The claims were never scientifically proved, and he was considered a charlatan by the United States Food and Drug Administration (FDA).

== Biography ==
Koch was born in Detroit. He obtained a BA in Chemistry from the University of Michigan in 1909 and an MA in 1910. In 1916 he obtained a PhD from the University of Michigan. There, Koch learned the principles of homeopathy from A. W. Dewey. In 1914 he was appointed Professor of Physiology at the Detroit College of Medicine and subsequently became Chairman of that department. He received an MD degree in 1918 from the Detroit College of Medicine.

Around 1919, Koch was advertising a product "synthetic anti-toxin" as a cancer cure. The product was dismissed by the American Medical Association and Wayne County Medical Society as a fraudulent cancer cure and is considered an example of quackery. In the 1920s, Koch falsely advertised his cancer cure product as being sponsored by the University of Michigan. The university dissociated itself from Koch's quackery.

In the early 1940s, Koch announced his discovery of glyoxylide, a miracle drug that would cure a long list of diseases, even when administered at one part per trillion dilution. He sold the drug through an entity called the Christian Medical Research League. He never revealed his process for the manufacture of glyoxylide, and there never was any evidence that glyoxylide in any amount had any therapeutic effect. Analysis showed it to be distilled water. Over 3,000 health practitioners in the U.S. paid $25 per ampoule for Koch's treatment and charged patients as much as $300 for a single injection.

The FDA sued Koch twice, in 1943 and 1946, but failed to get a conviction. After an inspection of his laboratories by the FDA, Koch announced his retirement, and moved to Brazil in 1950. A product known as the Koch treatment continued to be sold in Mexico long after it disappeared in the United States. Biographer Jay Robert Nash has written that Koch was an "infamous quack throughout his entire career."

== Selected publications ==
- Natural Immunity: Its Curative Chemistry In Neoplasia, Allergy, Infection (1934)
- The Chemistry Of Natural Immunity (1939)
- The Survival Factor In Neoplastic And Viral Diseases William Koch (1955)
