= Tricarbon monosulfide =

Names
- Preferred IUPAC name 3-Sulfanylidenepropa-1,2-dien-1-ylidene
- Other names Tricarbon sulfur

Identifiers
CAS Number	109545-35-9
3D model (JSmol)	Interactive image
ChemSpider	103868963
PubChem CID	13641175
CompTox Dashboard (EPA)	DTXSID601302203
- InChI: InChI=1S/C3S/c1-2-3-4 Key: DYOPWGBKIHJGRG-UHFFFAOYSA-N
- SMILES: [CH0]=C=C=S

Properties
Chemical formula	C_{3}S
Molar mass	68.09 g·mol^{−1}

Related compounds
Related carbon sulfides	dicarbon monosulfide carbon monosulfide carbon disulfide
Related compounds	tricarbon monoxide carbon subnitride
- Except where otherwise noted, data are given for materials in their standard state (at 25 °C [77 °F], 100 kPa). Infobox references

Tricarbon monosulfide (C_{3}S) or tricarbon sulfur is a reactive molecular substance that has been detected in outer space. Tricarbon monosulfide is a heterocumulene or thiocumulene, consisting of a straight chain of three carbon atoms and a terminal sulfur atom.

== Properties ==
The dipole moment of tricarbon monosulfide is 3.704 debye. The bond lengths are 1.275 Å, for terminal C=C bond, 1.292 Å for internal bond, and 1.535 Å for the C=S bond. The similar bond lengths between the carbon atoms indicate they each have a double bond nature. The rotational constants for ^{12}C^{12}C^{12}C^{32}S are B_{0} = 2890.38000 MHz and D_{0} = 0.00022416.

There is a characteristic infrared absorption band at 2047.5 cm^{−1} due to stretching of a C=C bond.

== Formation ==
Along with the related dicarbon monosulfide (CCS), tricarbon monosulfide was made by a glow discharge though carbon disulfide vapour in helium. Microwave emission lines from rotational transitions matched up with previously unknown molecular lines from the Taurus molecular cloud 1. Maximal concentrations occurred with a carbon disulfide pressure of 0.02 torr.

In molecular clouds, the formation mechanism is speculated to be CCS + CH → CCCS + H.

On dust grains, in space the formation mechanism is theorised to be: CCC + H_{2}S → C_{3}•HSH → CCCS + H_{2} when irradiated with visible or UV light. This reaction has been reproduced in a solid argon matrix.

== Natural occurrence ==
Tricarbon monosulfide has been detected in molecular clouds in space, such as the Taurus molecular cloud and the Kleinmann–Low Nebula. The ratio of tricarbon monoxide to tricarbon monosulfide reflects the ratio of sulfur to oxygen in the cloud. The ratio of concentration of sulfur to oxygen analogues follows the same pattern. The clouds can be cold and dark, or warm. CCCS has also been found in the stellar envelope of carbon-rich AGB stars, including in IRC+10216.
