= Polycarbonyl =

Polymer of carbon monoxide (CO)

Polycarbonyl, (also known as polymeric-CO, p-CO or poly-CO) is a solid, metastable, and explosive polymer of carbon monoxide. The polymer is produced by exposing carbon monoxide to high pressures. The structure of the solid appears amorphous, but may include a zigzag of equally-spaced CO groups.

== Formation ==
Poly-CO can be produced at pressures of 5.2 GPa; it is amorphous and yellow to dark red in color. Polymerisation is catalysed by blue light at slightly lower pressures in the δ-phase of solid CO. Another white, crystalline phase can be made at higher temperatures at 6 or 7 GPa.

R. J. Mills discovered this solid, which was first produced in a tungsten carbide anvil in 1947. Originally this was thought to be polymeric carbon suboxide, but the formation does not yield any gas byproduct such as carbon dioxide. The yield of the solid can be up to 95%.

== Properties ==
The polymer is stable above about 80 K. Below this temperature the ε form of solid molecular CO is formed instead. When the pressure is released the polymer remains stable at atmospheric pressure. The solid dissolves in water, alcohol and acetone. When exposed to the atmosphere it is hygroscopic, becomes gluey, and changes colour, becoming darker. The reaction with water produces carboxylic groups.

The solid stores a high energy. It can decompose explosively forming glassy carbon and carbon dioxide. The energy density stored can be up to 8 kJ/g. During the decomposition the temperature can be 2500 K. The density is 1.65 g/cm^{3}, however most of the solid produced is porous, so the true density is likely to be higher.

Infrared spectroscopy shows bands at 650, 1210, 1440, 1650 and 1760 cm^{−1}. The 1760 band is likely to be due to the -C-(C=O)-C- structure. The 1600 is due to vibration of a C=C double bond.

The solid is electrically insulating with an electronic gap energy of 1.9 eV.

Nuclear magnetic resonance for the material made from ^{13}CO shows sharp resonance at 223 ppm due to ester or lactone attached carbon, and 151 ppm due to C=C double bonds. There is also broad resonance at 109 and 189 ppm. Over time of a few days, the 223 ppm peak reduces and all the other features increase in strength.

== Structure ==
Ideas of the structure include a zigzag chain of CO pointing in opposite directions, or five atom rings connected by CO and C−C bonds. The rings are lactones of tetronic acid: −C:−(C=O)−(C−O^{−})−(C=O)−O−. Interconnections between the rings are zigzags of CO.

Other ideas of the structure of the solid, include graphitic carbon with carbon dioxide under pressure, and a polymer with this C_{3}O_{2} monomer: −(C=O)−O−(C^{−})=C<. Yet other ideas are that the solid is the same as the polymer of carbon suboxide with oxalic anhydride.

== Other reading ==
- Batyrev, I. G.; W. D. Mattson; B. M. Rice (2012). "Modeling of Early Stages of Formation of Poly-CO". MRS Proceedings. 1405 mrsf11-1405-y05-04. doi:10.1557/opl.2012.345. ISSN 1946-4274.
- Sun, Jian; Dennis D. Klug; Chris J. Pickard; Richard J. Needs (2011). "Controlling the Bonding and Band Gaps of Solid Carbon Monoxide with Pressure" (PDF). Physical Review Letters. 106 (14) 145502. Bibcode:2011PhRvL.106n5502S. doi:10.1103/PhysRevLett.106.145502. ISSN 0031-9007. PMID 21561202. S2CID 19591866.
