= Sulfine =

Names
- Preferred IUPAC name Methylidene-λ^{4}-sulfanone
- Other names sulfine

Identifiers
CAS Number	40100-16-1
3D model (JSmol)	Interactive image
ChemSpider	125626
PubChem CID	142407
CompTox Dashboard (EPA)	DTXSID20193145
- InChI: InChI=1S/CH2OS/c1-3-2/h1H2 Key: IWOKCMBOJXYDEE-UHFFFAOYSA-N
- SMILES: C=S=O

Properties
Chemical formula	CH_{2}OS
Molar mass	62.09 g·mol^{−1}
- Except where otherwise noted, data are given for materials in their standard state (at 25 °C [77 °F], 100 kPa). Infobox references

Sulfinylmethane or sulfine is an organic compound with molecular formula H_{2}CSO. It is the simplest sulfine. Sulfines are chemical compounds with the general structure XY=SO. IUPAC considers the term 'sulfine' obsolete, preferring instead thiocarbonyl S-oxide; despite this, the use of the term sulfine still predominates in the chemical literature.

== Substituted sulfines ==
The parent sulfine H_{2}CSO is very labile, whereas substituted derivatives are more conveniently isolated.

One route is a variant of ketene synthesis, in which a sulfinyl halide reacts with a hindered base. For example, syn-propanethial-S-oxide, responsible for eye-watering effects of cutting onions, is produced so from allicin.

Another route is oxidation, as with thiobenzophenone from diphenylsulfine:

(C_{6}H_{5})_{2}C=S + [O] → (C_{6}H_{5})_{2}C=S=O

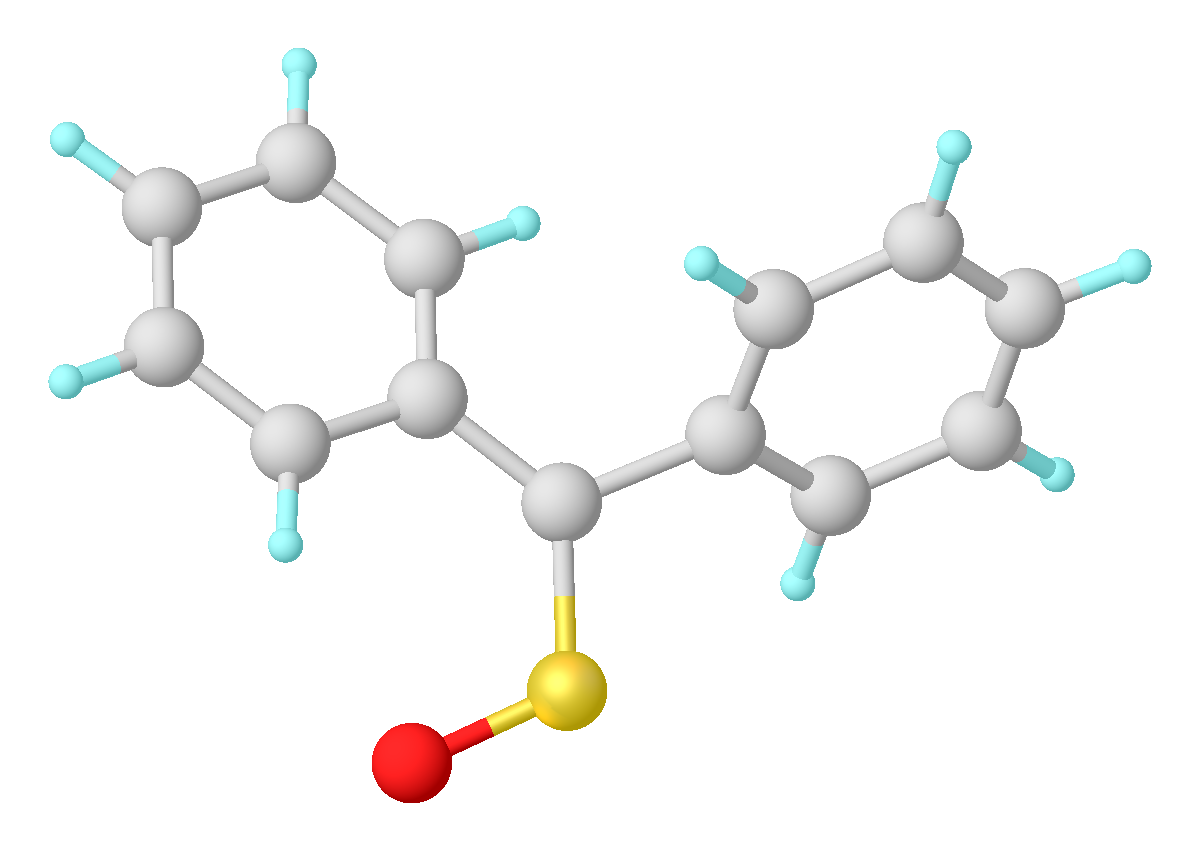
Structure of diphenylsulfine. Selected distances and angles: r_{S=O} = 1.468, r_{C=S} = 1.612 Å, <_{C=S=O} = 113.7°.

== See also ==
- Sulfene - related functional group with the formula H_{2}C=SO_{2}
- Sulfinylamine - related functional group with the formula -N=S=O
- Ethenone
- Heterocumulene
