= Carbodiphosphoranes =

Class of organophosphorus compounds

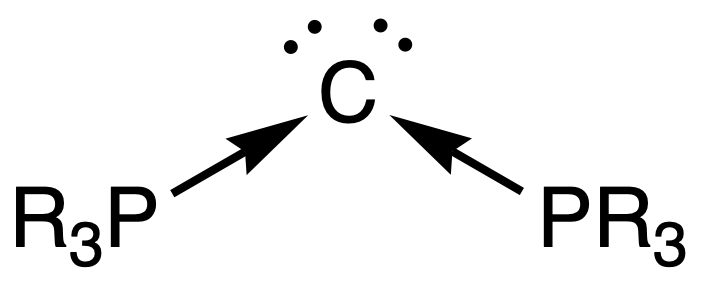
A general structure of a carbodiphosphorane

Carbodiphosphoranes are a class of organophosphorus compounds and a subtype of carbones with general formula C(PR_{3})_{2}, consisting of a central carbon atom bound to two phosphine ligands by dative bonds. The central carbon atom has formal oxidation state zero and two high-energy lone pairs with σ and π-symmetry, making carbodiphosphoranes highly nucleophilic and strongly σ- and π-donating through the carbon atom. Carbodiphosphoranes have gained interest for their unique double-donating properties, and have been used as ligands in a number of main group and transition metal complexes with applications in catalysis. Carbodiphosphoranes generally have a bent molecular geometry, but observed P–C–P bond angles range from 100° to 180°.

The term "carbodiphosphorane" can also refer to hexaphenylcarbodiphosphorane, the most common carbodiphosphorane used in chemistry and the first species synthesized.

== Structure and Bonding ==
The electronic structure of carbodiphosphoranes was initially proposed alongside their original synthesis in 1961 to be a resonance hybrid of a double-bonded species isoelectronic to carbodiimides and a bisylide with the central carbon atom having a formal charge of -2. Kaska et al. in 1971 proposed an additional coordinatively unsaturated structure with two dative bonds from the phosphorus lone pairs and all four valence electrons of carbon unengaged in bonding, which has since been confirmed as the major resonance contributor to carbodiphosphoranes by computational studies. In 1976, the earliest synthesis of a geminal dimetallated carbodiphosphorane species was reported by Schmidbaur et al., demonstrating for the first time their ability to bind two metals at the central carbon, which provided experimental evidence consistent with the bisylide and zero-valent resonance structures.

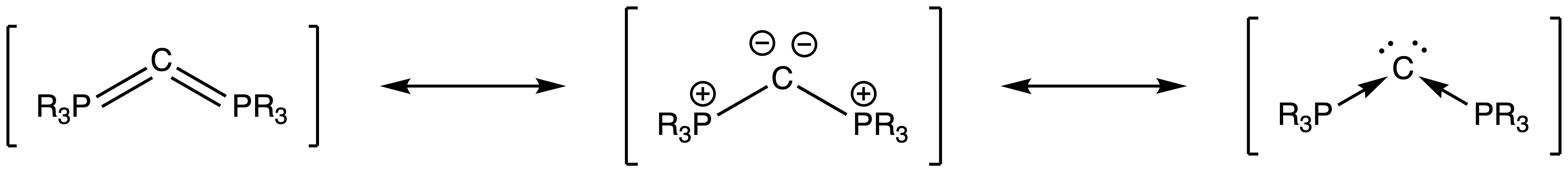
Resonance structures of a general carbodiphosphorane: the double-bonded species isoelectronic to carbodiimides (left), the bisylide (middle), and the donor-acceptor species (right)

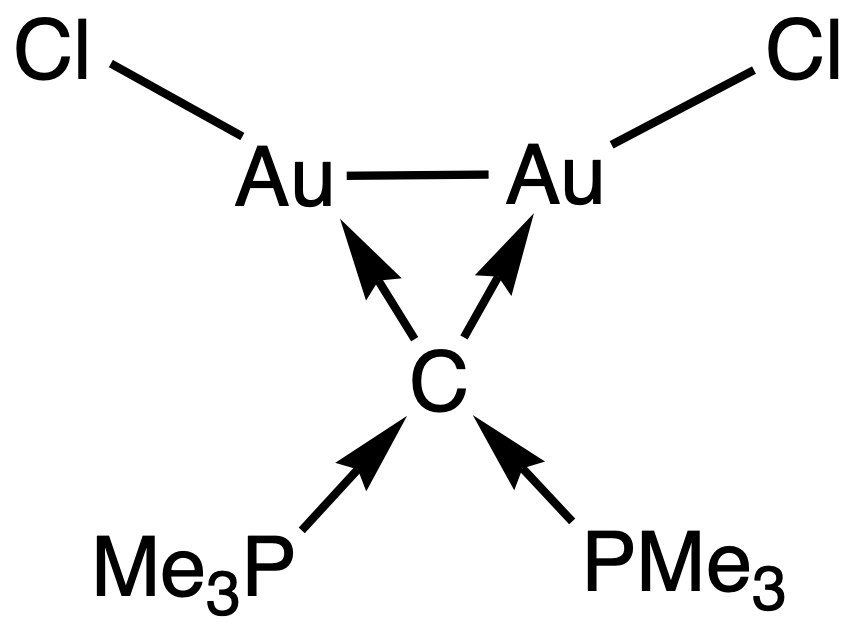
A geminal dimetallated carbodiphosphorane, with dative bonds through both carbon lone pairs. The geometry of the central carbon is tetrahedral

The electronic structure of the central carbon atom can be compared to the central carbon of N-heterocyclic carbenes, which have a σ-symmetric lone pair as the HOMO and an unoccupied π-symmetric orbital as the LUMO, making them good σ-donors and π-acceptors. In contrast, carbodiphosphoranes have two lone pairs, the π-symmetric HOMO and the σ-symmetric HOMO-1, and no carbon-centered electrons engaged in bonding. For this reason, carbodiphosphoranes are more strongly Lewis basic than carbenes and have stronger electron-donating ability, which has been evaluated by the Tolman Electronic Parameter (TEP). TEP can also be used to compare relative donor strengths between carbodiphosphoranes, which differ based on the nature of the phosphine. Because of the presence of the lone pairs, the molecular geometry is typically bent, with common P–C–P bond angles being around 120°–145°. However, a bond angle of 180° has been observed in hexaphenylcarbodiphosphorane under some crystallization conditions, instead of its typical 136.9° bond angle. This linear structure is unique among carbones, and the authors attribute this structure to the low energy difference of 3.1 kcal/mol, as determined by DFT calculations between the bent structure, with a σ- and π-symmetric lone pair, and the linear structure, where both lone pairs have π symmetry, allowing for a relatively labile bond.

Analogous bisylide species with sulfur atoms exchanged for one or both of the phosphorus atoms have also been synthesized and show similar nucleophilic properties. Similarly, mixed carbones with one phosphine and one N-heterocyclic carbene as donors can be synthesized.

== Synthesis ==
Hexaphenylcarbodiphosphorane was first successfully isolated by Ramírez et al. in 1961 by the reduction of methylidebis-(triphenylphosphonium) bromide with potassium metal in boiling diglyme. Generally, carbodiphosphoranes from triaryl phosphines are still synthesized by a method similar to Ramírez et al.'s, by first reacting the phosphine with methylene bromide or methylene iodide to form the diphosphonium salt, and subsequently deprotonating the intermediate with sodium amide or a similar base in THF. Alternatively, elimination of halide or trimethylsilyl phosphonium salts in the presence of a strong base can result in the target carbodiphosphorane.

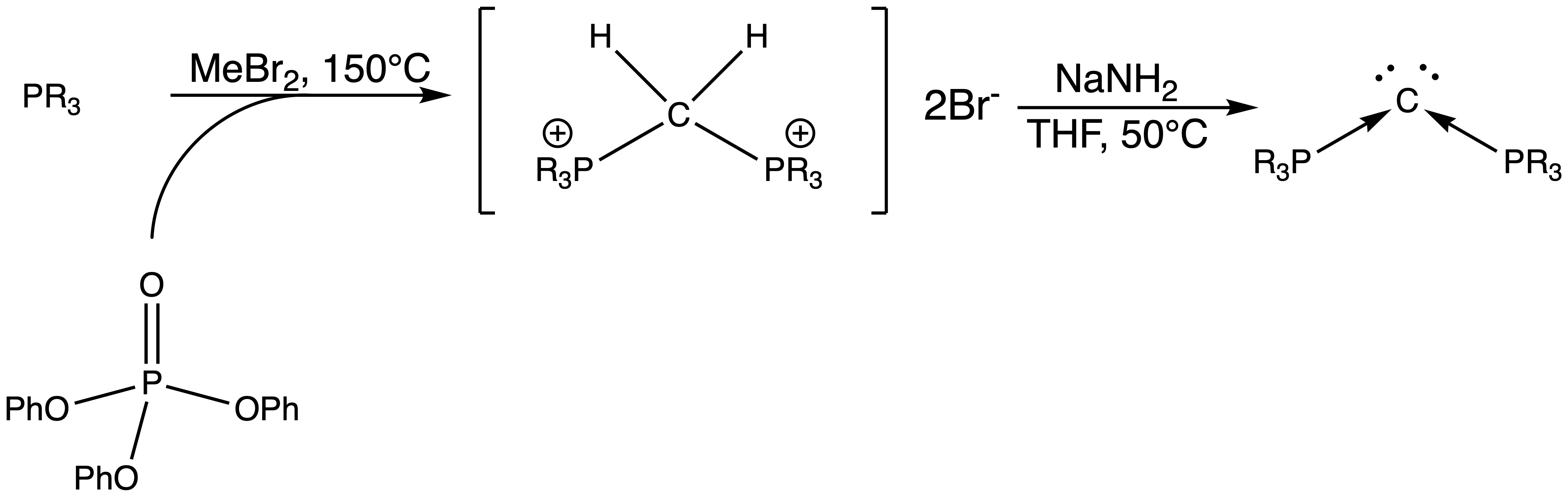
Synthesis of hexaaryl carbodiphosphoranes by double deprotonation of dibromide salt with sodium amide

For asymmetric carbodiphosphoranes, one phosphine can first be reacted with the dihalomethane in large excess, then the resulting phosphonium salt can be isolated and then reacted with the second phosphine, and the diphosphonium species deprotonated similarly by NaNH_{2}. The first alkyl-substituted carbodiphosphorane, namely hexamethylcarbodiphosphorane, was not synthesized until nearly 15 years after the report by Ramírez, and alkyl-containing carbodiphosphoranes are generally synthesized by alkylation of methylene di(aryl) or di(alkyl)phosphines. Cyclic carbodiphosphoranes can be synthesized by similar methods, with six- or seven-membered cyclic scaffolds being generally thermally stable as the structure accommodates the P–C–P bond angle of 130–150 degrees. However, five-membered cyclic carbodiphosphoranes require very strained P–C–P bond angles, close to 120 degrees, and readily isomerize without additional stabilization. A five-membered cyclic carbodiphosphorane stable to isomerization at room temperature was first achieved in 2006 by Baceiredo et al. from bis(diisopropylamino)phosphino diazomethane, with the other phosphine substituents replaced by amino groups. The synthesized species has a P–C–P bond angle of 104.8 degrees and is capable of thermal ring-contraction to form a four-membered heterocycle as well as thermal interconversion to a diphosphinocarbene species.

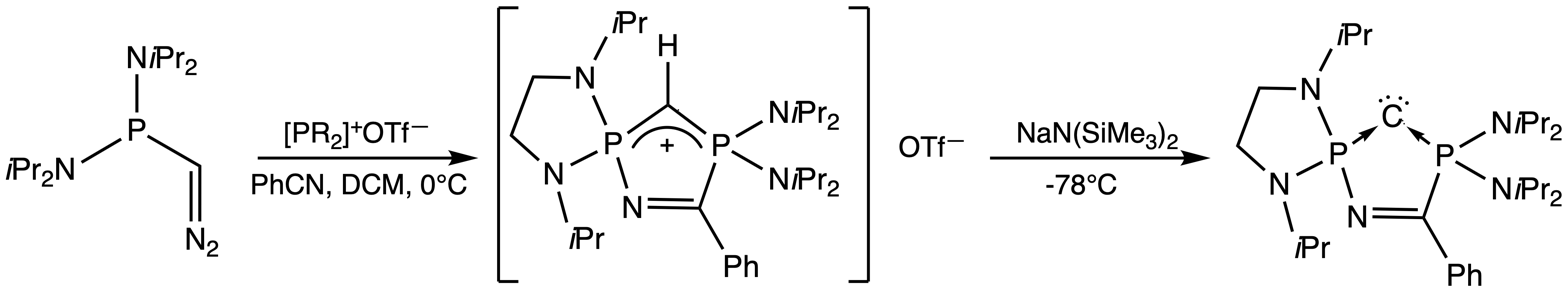
2006 synthesis of stable P-hetercyclic carbodiphosphorane from bis(diisopropylamino)phosphino diazomethane and a bis(dialkylamino)phosphenium salt

More complex carbodiphosphoranes have been synthesized from heteroatom-substituted triaryl phosphines and other mixed heteroatom-containing phosphines with the potential for stabilizing irregular metallic species. Chlorinated carbodiphosphoranes have been synthesized by reaction of excess carbon tetrachloride with the trimethylsilyl precursor, (Ph_{2}P)_{2}CH-SiMe_{3}. Methylene diphosphines such as bis(bis(dialkylaminophosphino))methane can be reacted with hexafluoroacetone or thioacetone to form carbodiphosphoranes with oxygen-substituted or sulfur-substituted substituents on the phosphines. Tridentate P,C,P pincer ligands, with chelating phosphines as substituents of the carbodiphosphorane phosphines, were originally synthesized as nickel, palladium, or platinum (II) complexes from MCl_{2}, carbon disulfide, and a bis(diarylphosphino)methane. A direct synthesis of the free carbodiphosphane was reported in 2020 from the chloride precursor in an excess of NaNH_{2} at -78 °C.

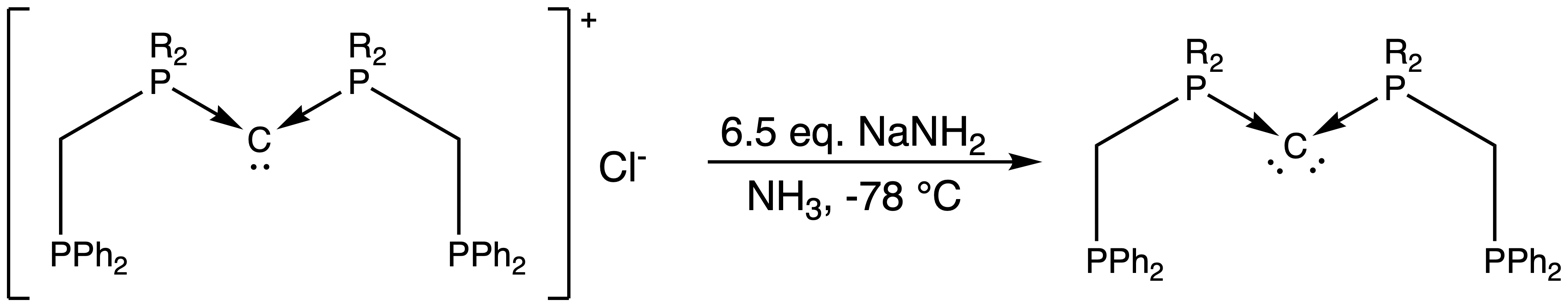
A direct synthesis of P,C,P pincer carbodiphosphorane from the phosphonium chloride salt precursor

== Coordination Chemistry ==
The double-donating ability of carbodiphosphoranes is believed to be able to stabilize elusive, low coordinated main-group compounds, with the isolation of the dihydrido borenium cation using hexaphenylcarbodiphosphorane demonstrating the feasibility of this strategy in 2011. Hexaphenylcarbodiphosphorane has also been reacted with diborane, forming an anionic geminal bridging complex with a three-center, two-electron B–H–B bond.

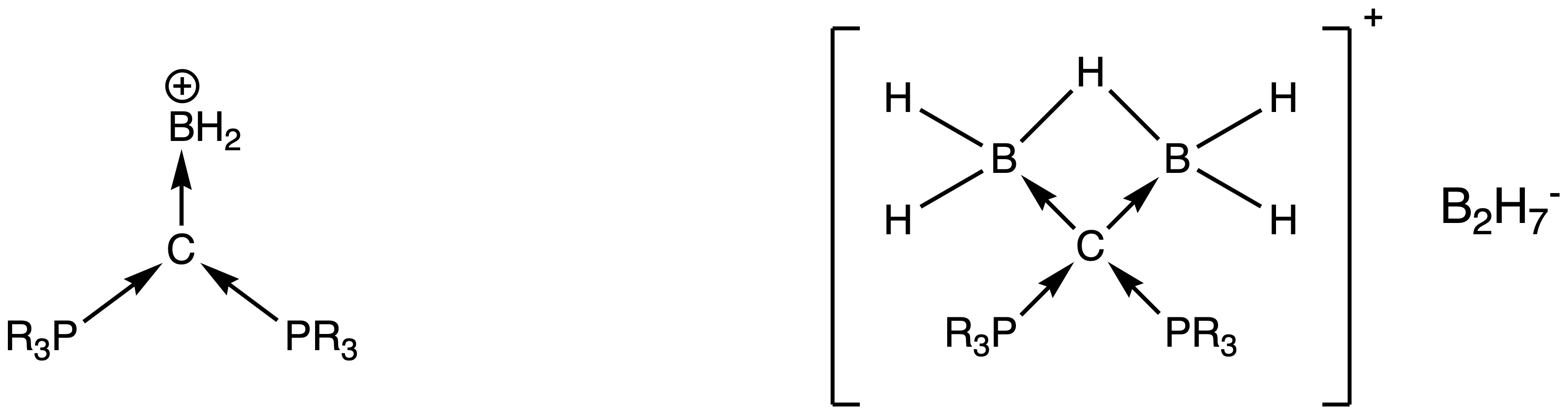
A generic carbodiphosphorane bound to the dihydro borenium cation (left) and geminally to diborane (right); the geometry of the geminal carbon is tetrahedral.

Carbodiphosphoranes form Lewis adducts to aluminum, gallium, and indium trichlorides, similar to other strong Lewis bases. Carbodiphosphoranes can coordinate to group 2 metals such as beryllium dichloride, as well as to heavier group 14 divalent species including SnCl_{2} and GeCl_{2} by π-donation, and on chlorine abstraction with AlCl_{3} can stabilize the cationic species [GeCl]^{+} and [Sn_{2}Cl_{2}]^{2+}_{.}

Carbodiphosphoranes can coordinate to transition metals as either two-electron σ-donors or four-electron σ- and π-donors. For instance, carbodiphosphoranes can complex with nickel carbonyl as a two-electron donor to Ni(CO)_{3} or geminally to Ni_{2}(CO)_{5} as a four-electron donor. P-heterocyclic carbodiphosphoranes have also been used as transition metal ligands, with rhodium (I) and palladium (II) complexes reported alongside their original synthesis. Chelating carbodiphosphoranes are commonly used in transition metal coordination complexes, such as P,C,P pincer ligands, made from two methylene diphosphine ligands donating through one phosphine to a central carbon atom, and N,C,N pincer ligands, which are made up of pyridyl-substituted diaryl phosphines.

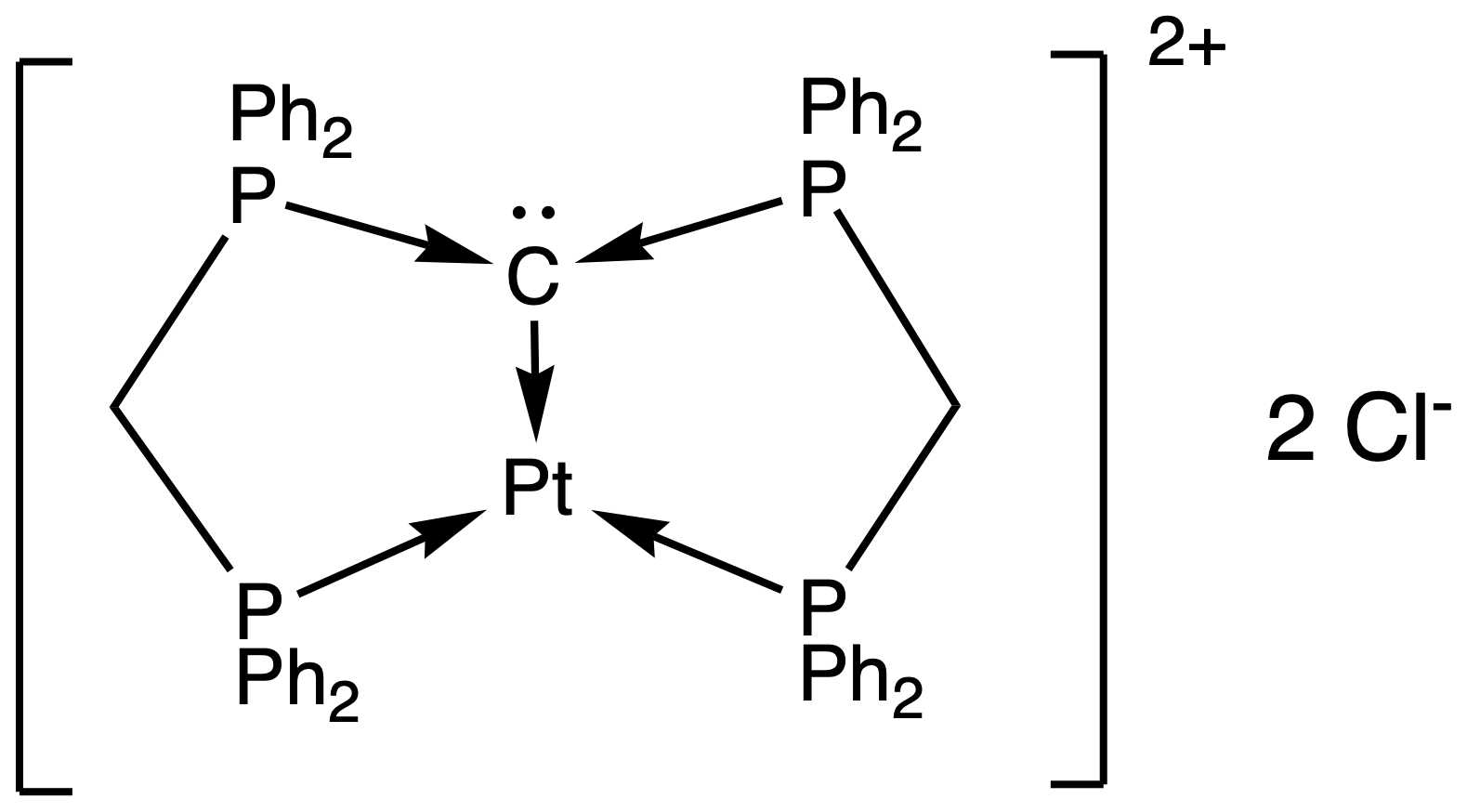
P,C,P pincer carbodiphosphorane ligands with platinum (II)

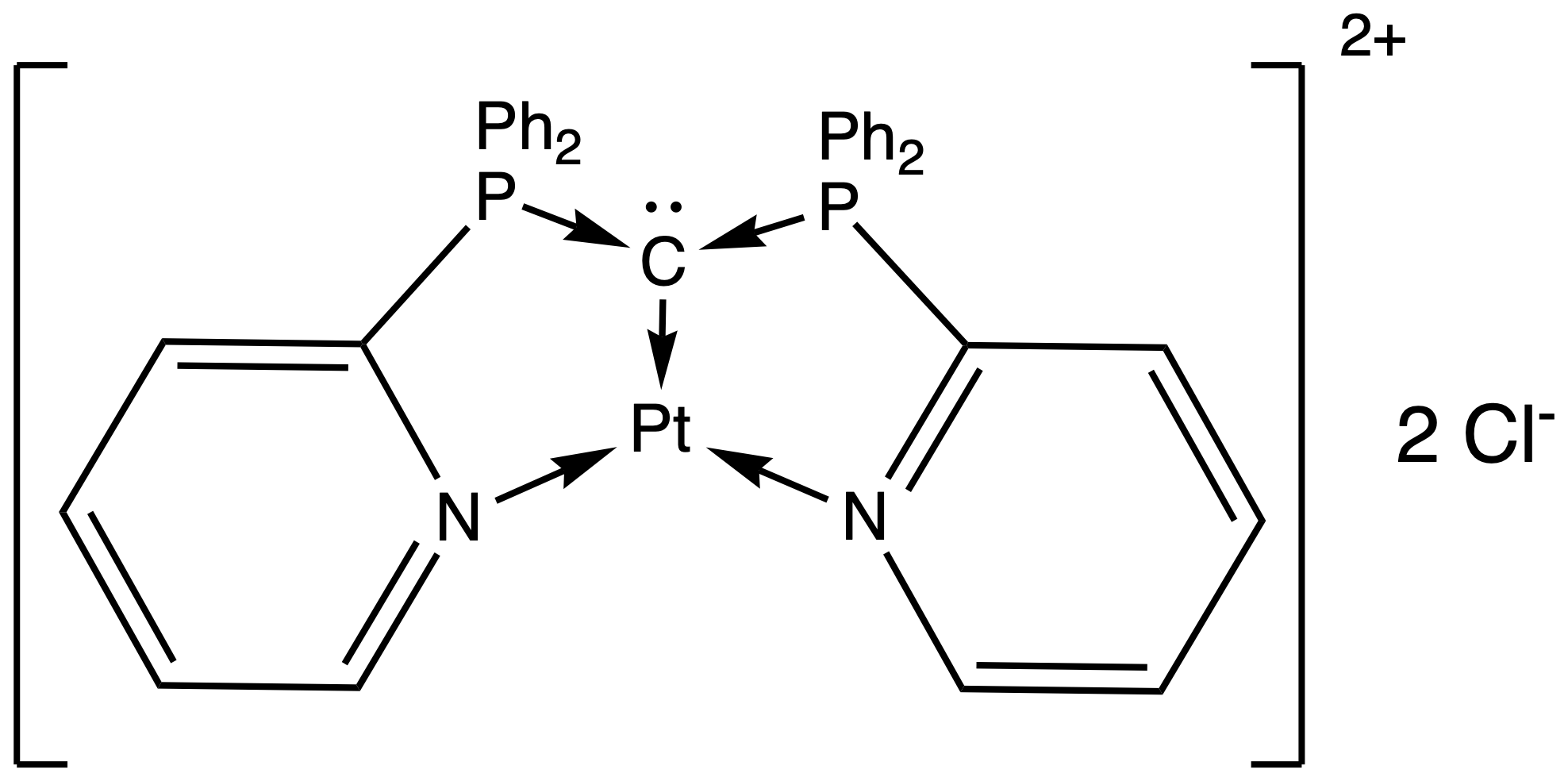
N,C,N pincer carbodiphosphorane ligands with platinum (II)

These pincer ligands have mainly been reported with group 10 and group 11 metals, but species using elements such as uranium and cerium have also been synthesized. Pincer carbodiphosphoranes have been found to stabilize homobimetallic complexes, including a geminally bonded bimetallic molybdenum complex in 2019 and a photoluminescent homobimetallic Cu(I) species in 2020. A C,C,C pincer-ligated complex with platinum (II) was further used as a synthon for a heterobimetallic Pt(II)—Ag(I) complex.

== Catalysis ==
While carbodiphosphoranes are not used in catalysis as widely as carbenes at present, they show promise in organic and inorganic catalysis due to their unique σ and π double lone pair character, both directly as catalysts or by targeting the electronics and acidity of transition metal catalysts as ligands. An in situ-generated carbodiphosphorane catalyst was described by Douglas Stephan in 2013 in the catalytic reduction of CO_{2} to CO with ZnBr_{2}, CH_{2}I_{2}, and triethylphosphine. PEt_{3} is proposed to react with CH_{2}I_{2} to generate the diphosphonium salt, which is deprotonated by excess PEt_{3} acting as a base, and the species cycles between the carbodiphosphorane and the phosphoketene until the reaction proceeds to completion. In 2021, the direct carbodiphosphorane-catalyzed hydroboration of ketones and imines was reported, exhibiting superior catalytic activity to other nucleophilic carbon species including N-heterocyclic carbenes and to the unstabilized phosphorus ylide

Catalytic reactivity of carbodiphosphoranes as ligands for transition metal complexes is often by stabilization of the catalytically active intermediate by increasing electron density at the metal center. Carbodiphosphoranes have been known to be catalytically viable as ligands since 2008, when a carbodiphosphorane Cu(I) complex demonstrated catalytic activity in the hydroamination of aniline with acrylonitrile, with improved catalysis over typical N-heterocyclic carbene-ligated species.

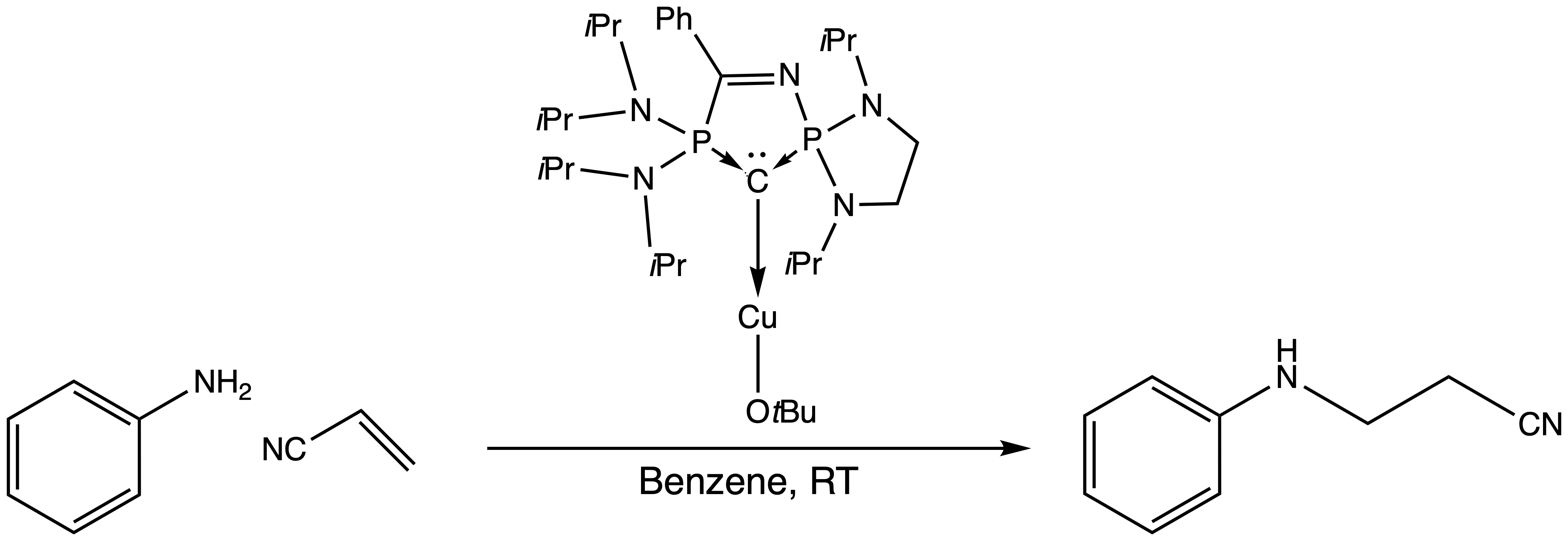
Catalytic hydroamination of aniline and acrylonitrile using a Cu(I) P-heterocyclic carbodiphosphorane complex

Hexaphenylcarbodiphosphorane has also been utilized to influence the product mixtures of catalytic cycles of cycloisomerization reactions by tuning the electron richness of the metal catalyst. The cyclization of eneallene by an Au(I) catalyst provides a different ratio of the [2+2] and [2+3] products depending on ligand donor strength, significantly favoring the [2+2] product when carbodiphosphorane is used as a ligand, as the more electron-rich gold catalyst makes the directly adjacent carbon more nucleophilic and favors reactivity at this site. In 2024, a carbodiphosphorane-stabilized stannylene, a heavier analogue of a carbene, was reported and its ability to perform the steps of transition metal-like Sn(II)/Sn(IV) redox catalysis was demonstrated. The complex used a C,C,C tridentate pincer ligand with the surrounding carbon atoms belonging to X-type aryl ligands, and the redox activity catalyzed the hydrodefluorination of pentafluoropyridine and other fluoroarenes by oxidative addition and ligand metathesis, followed by reductive elimination.

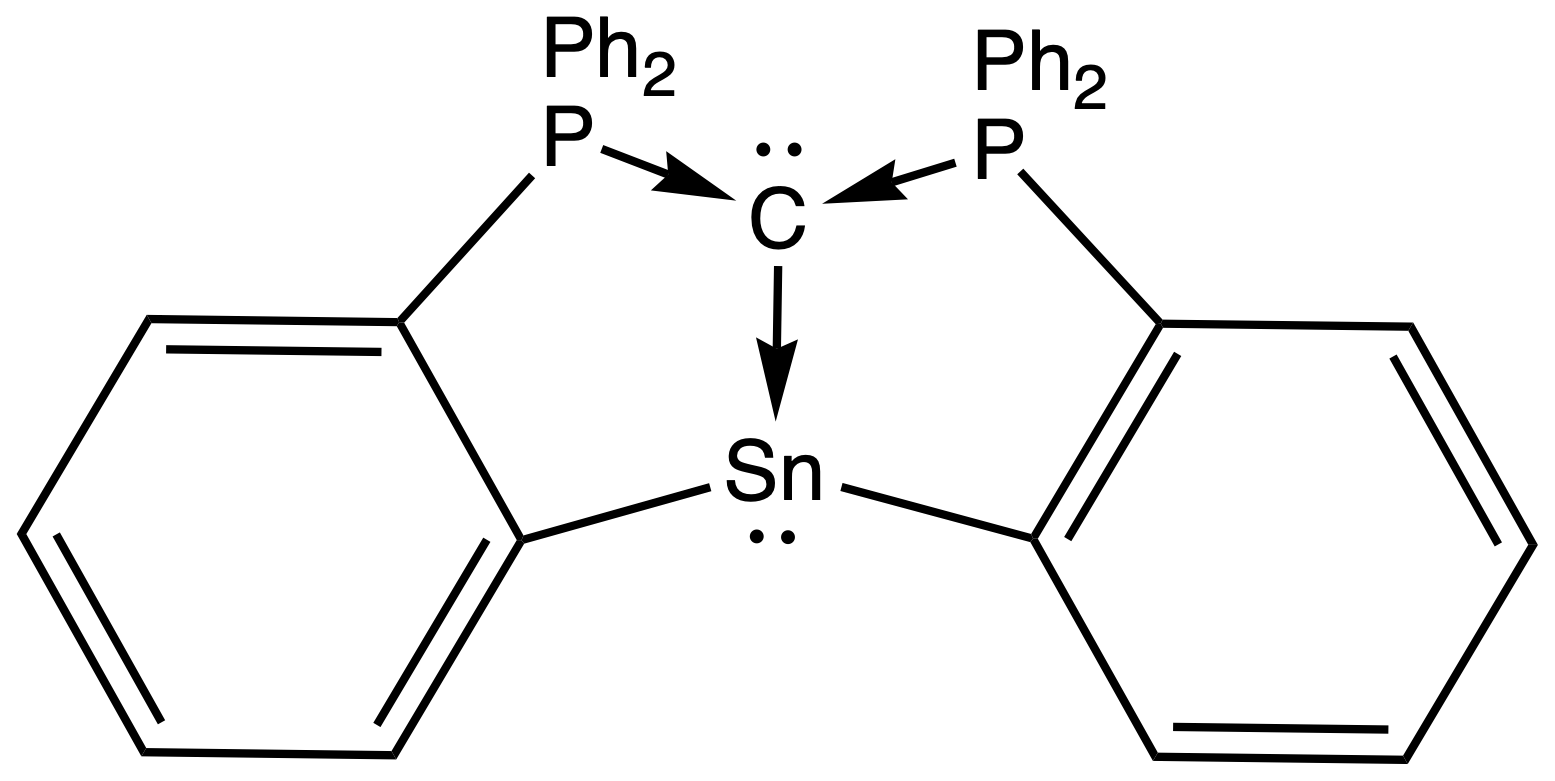
C,C,C pincer carbodiphosphorane-stabilized stannylene in the +2 oxidation state
