= Disilicon carbide =

Names
- Other names 1,3-disilaallene; Methanediylidenebis(silane)

Identifiers
CAS Number	12070-04-1
3D model (JSmol)	Interactive image
PubChem CID	6327159
CompTox Dashboard (EPA)	DTXSID10923539
- InChI: InChI=1S/CSi2/c2-1-3 Key: UHWJBUHEONRYRE-UHFFFAOYSA-N
- SMILES: [Si]=C=[Si]

Related compounds
Related compounds	Tricarbon; Silicon dicarbide; Silicon carbide; SiC_{4}
- Except where otherwise noted, data are given for materials in their standard state (at 25 °C [77 °F], 100 kPa). Infobox references

Disilicon carbide is an unstable inorganic molecule with formula SiCSi or Si_{2}C. It can exist as a dilute gas, or in a solid noble gas matrix. In nature it occurs in the envelope of super-giant carbon-rich stars.

== Properties ==
The Si_{2}C molecule is bent into a V shape. The angle Si-C-Si is 114.87°, and the C-Si bond lengths are 1.693 Å. This structure differs significantly from tricarbon C_{3} which is linear, and silicon dicarbide SiC_{2} which is a three-membered ring (triangle). The molecule has C_{2v} symmetry.

When condensed with solid argon, it exhibits infrared absorption lines at 1188.9 and 658.2 cm^{−1}.

Disilicon carbide cations Si_{2}C^{+} also exist.

Early theoretical calculations of the shape of the molecule were wrong, and attempts to calculate the microwave spectrum were very sensitive to changes. Even zero-point energy causes an offset of 2 GHz. Because of nuclear spin statistics (both of carbon and silicon have their main isotopes with no spin in the nucleus), many of the rotation transitions are forbidden. Researchers also found that the lowest transition frequency was still too high for their apparatus to measure, so they use carbon-13 to increase the rotational inertia, and drop the line frequency by 10%, so that it could be measured.

== Production ==
When silicon carbide is heated to high temperature and evaporated, SiCSi is the most common molecule in the gas phase.

In the lab, SiCSi can be made from silane and methane, diluted in neon, subject to an electric discharge.

2 SiH_{4} + CH_{4} → SiCSi + 6 H_{2}

Another way to produce it is by laser ablation of solid silicon to make silicon gas, which in diluted methane, reacts to form disilicon carbide.

2 Si + CH_{4} → SiCSi + 2 H_{2}

== Natural occurrence ==
Si_{2}C has been discovered in the carbon-rich star RW Leo. In this star Si_{2}C is ten times more abundant than C_{2}Si.

Other silicon-containing molecules found in carbon rich stars include SiO, SiH_{4}, c-SiC_{2}, SiS, SiC, C_{4}Si, SiN, c-SiC_{3}, SiCN, SiNC, and SiH_{3}CN.

SiCSi is likely an important component in the formation of silicon carbide grains, which are a significant part of pre-solar grains found in meteorites.
