= Pentacarbon dioxide =

Chemical compound

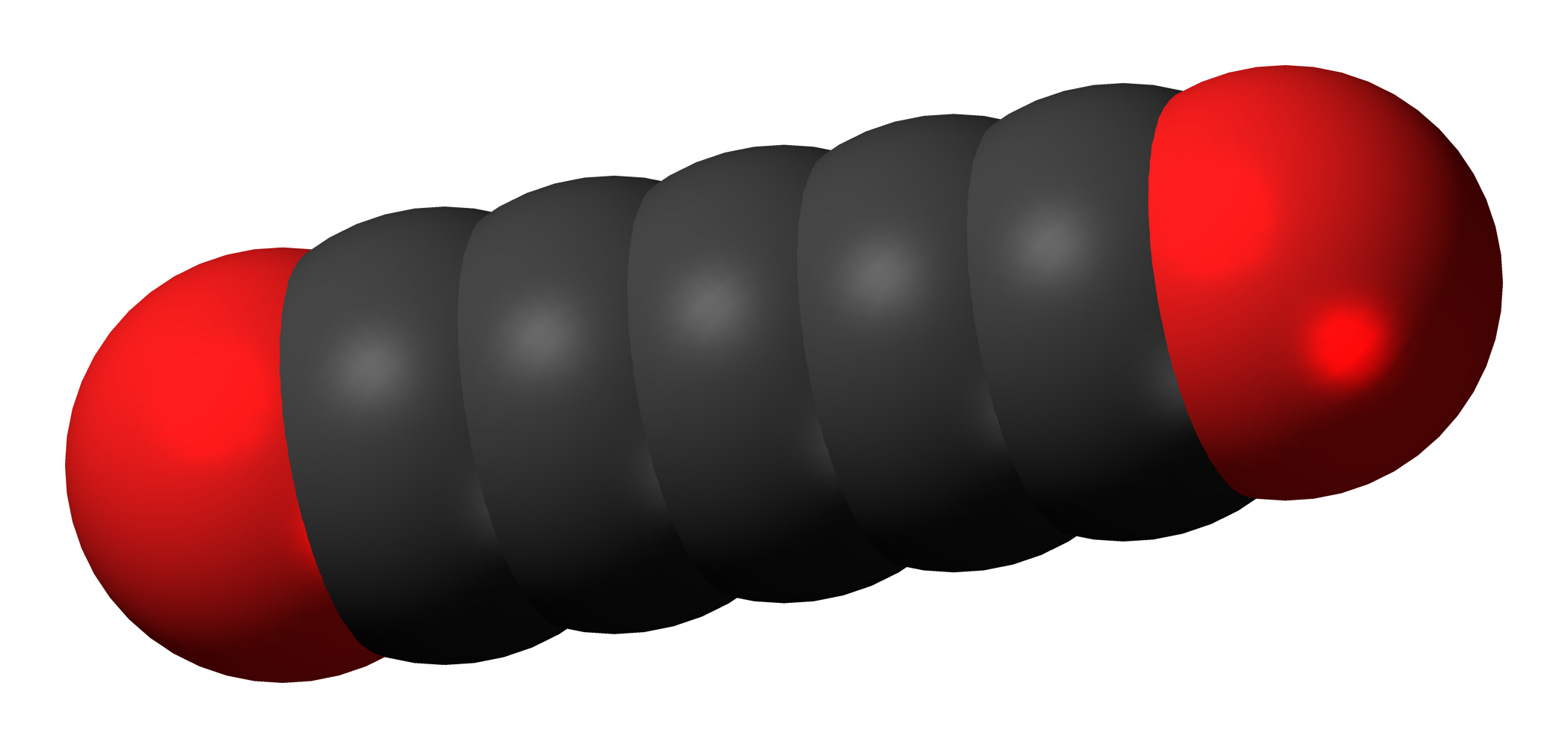

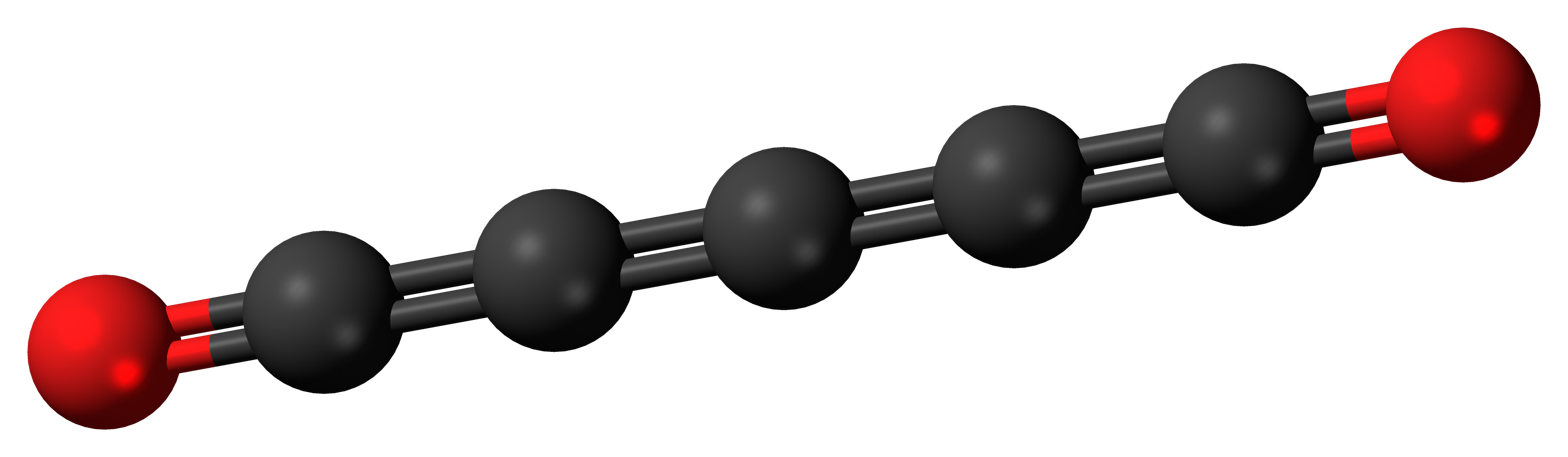

Names
- IUPAC name penta-1,2,3,4-tetraene-1,5-dione

Identifiers
CAS Number	51799-36-1
3D model (JSmol)	Interactive image
ChemSpider	454765
PubChem CID	521350
CompTox Dashboard (EPA)	DTXSID90334624
- InChI: InChI=1S/C5O2/c6-4-2-1-3-5-7 Key: BKMBQDLZBSCFGV-UHFFFAOYSA-N; InChI=1/C5O2/c6-4-2-1-3-5-7 Key: BKMBQDLZBSCFGV-UHFFFAOYAJ
- SMILES: O=C=C=C=C=C=O

Properties
Chemical formula	C_{5}O_{2}
Molar mass	92.05 g/mol
- Except where otherwise noted, data are given for materials in their standard state (at 25 °C [77 °F], 100 kPa). verify (what is ?) Infobox references

Pentacarbon dioxide, officially penta-1,2,3,4-tetraene-1,5-dione, is an oxide of carbon (an oxocarbon) with formula C_{5}O_{2} or O=C=C=C=C=C=O.

The compound was described in 1988 by Günter Maier and others, who obtained it by pyrolysis of 2,4,6-tris(diazo)cyclohexane-1,3,5-trione (C_{6}N_{6}O_{3}). Diazo transfer can produce the latter compound from phloroglucinol. It is stable at room temperature in solution. The pure compound is stable up to −90 °C, at which point it polymerizes.

== See also ==
- Ethylene dione (C_{2}O_{2})
- Carbon suboxide (C_{3}O_{2})
