= Ethenedithione =

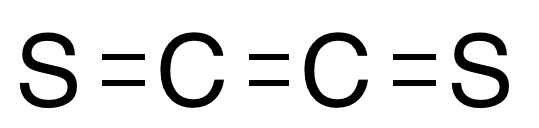

Names
- IUPAC name Ethenedithione

Identifiers
CAS Number	83917-77-5
3D model (JSmol)	Interactive image
ChemSpider	26668537
PubChem CID	71414826
CompTox Dashboard (EPA)	DTXSID20834263
- InChI: InChI=1S/C2S2/c3-1-2-4 Key: JFSYYGOHKMDXOA-UHFFFAOYSA-N
- SMILES: C(=C=S)=S

Properties
Chemical formula	C_{2}S_{2}
Molar mass	88.14 g·mol^{−1}
- Except where otherwise noted, data are given for materials in their standard state (at 25 °C [77 °F], 100 kPa). Infobox references

Ethenedithione or ethylenedithone is an unstable chemical substance with formula S=C=C=S made from carbon and sulfur.

Ethenedithione can exist as a gas at low pressure and high temperature, but is unstable when condensed or under higher pressure.

It can be stabilized as a ligand binding two cobalt atoms.

Other occurrences as a ligand are in TpW(CO)_{2}(C_{2}S_{2})^{–} and [TpW(CO)_{2}]_{2}Ni(C_{2}S_{2})_{2}, where Tp is trispyrazolylborate.

== Formation ==
Ethenedithione can be made by the flash vacuum pyrolysis of 2,5-Dithiacyclopentylideneketene.

Also it has been made by dissociative ionization of tetrathiapentalenedione, and then neutralisation of ions produced.

C_{2}S_{2} is made along with carbon subsulfide and carbon monosulfide, in an electric discharge in carbon disulfide vapour.

== Properties ==
In its ground state it is a triplet state (^{3}Σ_{g}^{−}). Ethenedithione can be trapped in a matrix of solid argon without decomposition.

The infrared spectrum contains a prominent line at 1179.3 cm^{−1} due to asymmetric C=S stretch of the most common isotopes.

Over 60 K, ethenedithione polymerises. Possible polymerisation products include polythiene.
