= Oxocarbon =

Chemical compounds made of only carbon and oxygen

In chemistry, an oxocarbon or oxide of carbon is a chemical compound consisting only of carbon and oxygen. The simplest and most common oxocarbons are carbon monoxide (CO) and carbon dioxide (CO_{2}). Many other stable (practically if not thermodynamically) or metastable oxides of carbon are known, but they are rarely encountered, such as carbon suboxide (C_{3}O_{2} or O=C=C=C=O) and mellitic anhydride (C_{12}O_{9}).

CO; Carbon monoxide	CO_{2} Carbon dioxide	C_{3}O_{2} Carbon suboxide	C_{12}O_{9} Mellitic anhydride

Many other oxides are known today, most of them synthesized since the 1960s. Some of these new oxides are stable at room temperature. Some are metastable or stable only at very low temperatures, but decompose to simpler oxocarbons when warmed. Many are inherently unstable and can be observed only momentarily as intermediates in chemical reactions or are so reactive that they exist only in gas phase or have only been detected by matrix isolation.

Graphene oxide and other stable polymeric carbon oxides with unbounded molecular structures exist.

== Overview ==
Carbon dioxide (CO_{2}) occurs widely in nature, and was incidentally produced by humans and nature since pre-historical times, by breathing, the combustion of carbon-containing substances, and fermentation of foods such as beer and bread. It was gradually recognized as a chemical substance, formerly called spiritus sylvestris ("forest spirit") or "fixed air", by various chemists in the 17th and 18th centuries.

Carbon monoxide may occur in combustion, too, and was used (though not recognized) since antiquity for the smelting of iron from its ores. Like the dioxide, it was described and studied in the West by various alchemists and chemists since the Middle Ages. Its true composition was discovered by William Cruickshank in 1800.

Carbon suboxide was discovered by Benjamin Brodie in 1873, by passing electric current through carbon dioxide.

The fourth "classical" oxide, mellitic anhydride (C_{12}O_{9}), was apparently obtained by Liebig and Wöhler in 1830 in their study of mellite ("honeystone"), but was characterized only in 1913, by Meyer and Steiner.

Brodie also discovered in 1859 a fifth compound called graphite oxide, consisting of carbon and oxygen in ratios varying between 2:1 and 3:1; but the nature and molecular structure of this substance remained unknown until a few years ago, when it was renamed graphene oxide and became a topic of research in nanotechnology.

Notable examples of unstable or metastable oxides that were detected only in extreme situations are dicarbon monoxide radical (:C=C=O), carbon trioxide (CO_{3}), carbon tetroxide (CO_{4}), carbon pentoxide (CO_{5}), carbon hexoxide (CO_{6}) and 1,2-dioxetanedione (C_{2}O_{4}). Some of these reactive carbon oxides were detected within molecular clouds in the interstellar medium by rotational spectroscopy.

Many hypothetical oxocarbons have been studied by theoretical methods but have yet to be detected. Examples include oxalic anhydride (C_{2}O_{3} or O=(C_{2}O)=O), ethylene dione (C_{2}O_{2} or O=C=C=O) and other linear or cyclic polymers of carbon monoxide (−CO−)_{n} (polyketones), and linear or cyclic polymers of carbon dioxide (−CO_{2}−)_{n}, such as the dimer 1,3-dioxetanedione (C_{2}O_{4}).

C_{2}O_{3} Oxalic anhydride	C_{2}O_{2} Ethylene dione	C_{2}O_{4} 1,3-Dioxetane- dione

== General structure ==
Normally, carbon is tetravalent, while oxygen is divalent, and in most oxocarbons (as in most other carbon compounds) each carbon atom may be bound to four other atoms, while oxygen may be bound to at most two. Moreover, while carbon can connect to other carbons to form arbitrarily large chains or networks, chains of three or more oxygens are rarely, if ever, observed. Thus the known electrically neutral oxocarbons generally consist of one or more carbon skeletons (including cyclic and aromatic structures) connected and terminated by oxide (−O−, =O) or peroxide (−O−O−) groups.

Carbon atoms with unsatisfied bonds are found in some oxides, such as the diradical C_{2}O or :C=C=O; but these compounds are generally too reactive to be isolated in bulk. Loss or gain of electrons can result in monovalent negative oxygen (−O^{−}), trivalent positive oxygen (≡O^{+}), or trivalent negative carbon (≡C^{−}). The last two are found in carbon monoxide, ^{−}C≡O^{+}. Negative oxygen occurs in most oxocarbon anions.

== Linear carbon dioxides ==
One family of carbon oxides has the general formula C_{n}O_{2}, or O=(C=)_{n}O—namely, a linear chain of carbon atoms, capped by oxygen atoms at both ends. The first members are

- CO_{2} or O=C=O, the well-known carbon dioxide.
- C_{2}O_{2} or O=C=C=O, the unknown and extremely unstable ethylene dione.
- C_{3}O_{2} or O=C=C=C=O, the metastable carbon suboxide or tricarbon dioxide.
- C_{4}O_{2} or O=C=C=C=C=O, tetracarbon dioxide or 1,2,3-Butatriene-1,4-dione
- C_{5}O_{2} or O=C=C=C=C=C=O, pentacarbon dioxide, stable in solution at room temperature and pure up to −90 °C.

Some higher members of this family have been detected in trace amounts in low-pressure gas phase or cryogenic matrix experiments, specifically for n = 7 and n = 17, 19, and 21.

== Linear carbon monoxides ==
Another family of oxocarbons are the linear carbon monoxides C_{n}O. The first member, ordinary carbon monoxide CO, seems to be the only one that is practically stable in the pure state at room temperature (though it is not thermodynamically stable at standard temperature and pressure, see Boudouard reaction). Photolysis of the linear carbon dioxides in a cryogenic matrix leads to loss of CO, resulting in detectable amounts of even-numbered monoxides such as C_{2}O, C_{4}O, and C_{6}O. The members up to n=9 have also been obtained by electrical discharge on gaseous C_{3}O_{2} diluted in argon. The first three members have been detected in interstellar space.

When n is even, the molecules are believed to be in the triplet (cumulene-like) state, with the atoms connected by double bonds and an unfilled orbital in the first carbon—as in :C=C=O, :C=C=C=C=O, and, in general, :(C=)_{n}O. When n is odd, the triplet structure is believed to resonate with a singlet (acetylene-type) polar state with a negative charge on the carbon end and a positive one on the oxygen end, as in ^{−}C≡C−C≡O^{+}, ^{−}C≡C−C≡C−C≡O^{+}, and, in general, ^{−}(C≡C−)_{(n−1)/2}C≡O^{+}. Carbon monoxide itself follows this pattern: its predominant form is believed to be ^{−}C≡O^{+}.

== Radialene-type cyclic polyketones ==
Another family of oxocarbons that has attracted special attention are the cyclic radialene-type oxocarbons C_{n}O_{n} or (CO)_{n}. They can be regarded as cyclic polymers of carbon monoxide, or n-fold ketones of n-carbon cycloalkanes. Carbon monoxide itself (CO) can be regarded as the first member. Theoretical studies indicate that ethylene dione (C_{2}O_{2} or O=C=C=O) and cyclopropanetrione C_{3}O_{3} do not exist. The next three members—C_{4}O_{4}, C_{5}O_{5}, and C_{6}O_{6}—are theoretically possible, but are expected to be quite unstable, and so far they have been synthesized only in trace amounts.

CO_{2} Ethylene dione	(CO)_{3} Cyclopropane- trione	(CO)_{4} Cyclobutane- tetrone	(CO)_{5} Cyclopentane- pentone	(CO)_{6} Cyclohexane- hexone

On the other hand, the anions of these oxocarbons are quite stable, and some of them have been known since the 19th century. They are

- C_{2}O^{2−}_{2}, acetylenediolate (Weiss and Büchner, 1963),
- C_{3}O^{2−}_{3}, deltate (Eggerding and West, 1976),
- C_{4}O^{2−}_{4}, squarate (Cohen and others, 1959),
- C_{5}O^{2−}_{5}, croconate (Gmelin, 1825), and
- C_{6}O^{2−}_{6}, rhodizonate (Heller, 1837).

The cyclic oxide C_{6}O_{6} also forms the stable anions of tetrahydroxy-1,4-benzoquinone (C_{6}O^{4−}_{6}) and benzenehexol (C_{6}O^{6−}_{6}), The aromaticity of these anions has been studied using theoretical methods.

== New oxides ==
Many new stable or metastable oxides have been synthesized since the 1960s, such as:

- C_{10}O_{8}, benzoquinonetetracarboxylic dianhydride (Hammond, 1963).
- C_{6}O_{6}, ethylenetetracarboxylic dianhydride, a stable isomer of cyclohexanehexone (Sauer and others, 1967).
- C_{12}O_{12} or C_{6}(C_{2}O_{4})_{3}C, hexahydroxybenzene trisoxalate (Verter and Dominic, 1967); stable as a tetrahydrofuran solvate.
- C_{10}O_{10} or C_{6}O_{2}(C_{2}O_{4})_{2}, tetrahydroxy-1,4-benzoquinone bisoxalate (Verter and others, 1968); stable as a tetrahydrofuran solvate.
- C_{8}O_{8} or C_{6}O_{2}(CO_{3})_{2}, tetrahydroxy-1,4-benzoquinone biscarbonate (Nallaiah, 1984); decomposes at about 45–53 °C.
- C_{9}O_{9} or C_{6}(CO_{3})_{3}, hexahydroxybenzene triscarbonate (Nallaiah, 1984); decomposes at about 45–53 °C.
- C_{24}O_{6}, a cyclic trimer of the biradical 3,4-dialkynyl-3-cyclobutene-1,2-dione −C≡C−(C_{4}O_{2})−C≡C− (Rubin and others, 1990);
- C_{32}O_{8}, a tetramer of 3,4-dialkynyl-3-cyclobutene1,2-dione (Rubin and others, 1990);
- C_{4}O_{6}, dioxane tetraketone or dimeric oxalic anhydride (Strazzolini and others, 1998); stable in Et_{2}O at −30 °C, decomposes at 0 °C.
- C_{12}O_{6}, hexaoxotricyclobutabenzene

C_{10}O_{8} Benzoquinone- tetracarboxylic dianhydride	C_{6}O_{6} Ethylene- tetracarboxylic dianhydride	C_{10}O_{10} Tetrahydroxy- 1,4-benzoquinone bisoxalate
C_{8}O_{8} Tetrahydroxy- 1,4-benzoquinone biscarbonate	C_{4}O_{6} Dioxane tetraketone	C_{12}O_{12} Hexahydroxybenzene trisoxalate
C_{9}O_{9} Hexahydroxybenzene triscarbonate	C_{24}O_{6} Tris(3,4-dialkynyl- 3-cyclobutene- 1,2-dione)	C_{32}O_{8} Tetrakis(3,4-dialkynyl- 3-cyclobutene- 1,2-dione)
C_{12}O_{6} Hexaoxotricyclo- butabenzene

Many relatives of these oxides have been investigated theoretically, and some are expected to be stable, such as other carbonate and oxalate esters of tetrahydroxy-1,2-benzoquinone and of the rhodizonic, croconic, squaric, and deltic acids.

== Polymeric carbon oxides ==
Carbon suboxide spontaneously polymerizes at room temperature into a carbon-oxygen polymer, with 3:2 carbon:oxygen atomic ratio. The polymer is believed to be a linear chain of fused six-membered lactone rings, with a continuous carbon backbone of alternating single and double bonds. Physical measurements indicate that the mean number of units per molecule is about 5–6, depending on the formation temperature.

Terminating and repeating units of polymeric C_{3}O_{2}.

Oligomers of C_{3}O_{2} with 3 to 6 units.

Carbon monoxide compressed to 5 GPa in a diamond anvil cell yields a somewhat similar reddish polymer with a slightly higher oxygen content, which is metastable at room conditions. It is believed that CO disproportionates in the cell to a mixture of CO_{2} and C_{3}O_{2}; the latter forms a polymer similar to the one described above (but with a more irregular structure), that traps some of the CO_{2} in its matrix.

Another carbon-oxygen polymer, with C:O ratio 5:1 or higher, is the classical graphite oxide and its single-sheet version graphene oxide.

== Fullerene oxides and ozonides ==
More than 20 oxides and ozonides of fullerene are known:

- C_{60}O (2 isomers)
- C_{60}O_{2} (6 isomers)
- C_{60}O_{3} (3 isomers)
- C_{120}O
- C_{120}O_{4} (4 isomers)
- C_{70}O
- C_{140}O

and others.

== See also ==
- Pseudo-oxocarbon anion
- Carbon nitride
