= Dicarbon monoxide =

Stick model of dicarbon monoxide
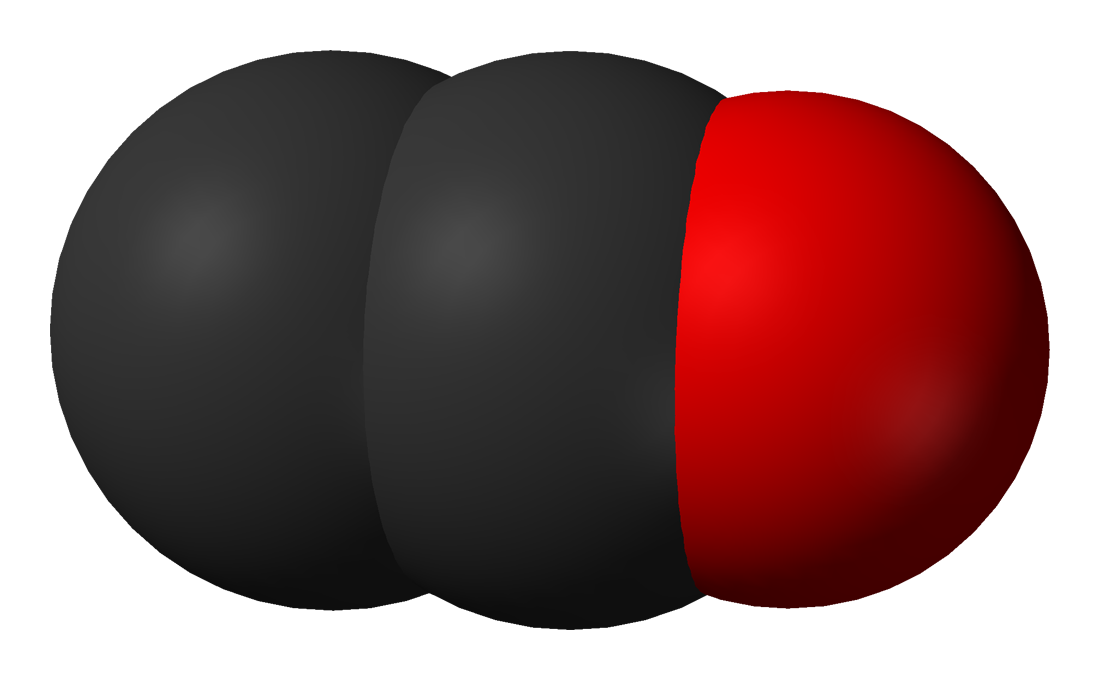
Spacefill model of dicarbon monoxide
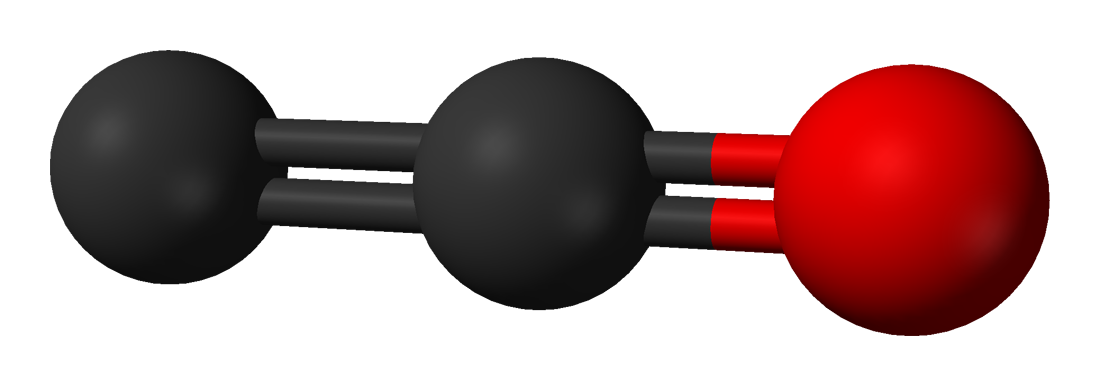
- Ball and stick model of dicarbon monoxide

Names
- IUPAC name 2-Oxoethenylidene
- Other names Ketenylidene

Identifiers
| CAS Number | 119754-08-4 |
| 3D model (JSmol) | Interactive image |
| ChemSpider | 164756 |
| PubChem CID | 189691 |
| CompTox Dashboard (EPA) | DTXSID80152576 |
- InChI: InChI=1S/C2O/c1-2-3 Key: VILAVOFMIJHSJA-UHFFFAOYSA-N; InChI=1S/C2O/c1-2-3 Key: VILAVOFMIJHSJA-UHFFFAOYSA-N; InChI=1/C2O/c1-2-3 Key: VILAVOFMIJHSJA-UHFFFAOYAI
- SMILES: [C]=C=O

Properties
| Chemical formula | C_{2}O |
| Molar mass | 40.021 g·mol^{−1} |
- Except where otherwise noted, data are given for materials in their standard state (at 25 °C [77 °F], 100 kPa). verify (what is ?) Infobox references

Dicarbon monoxide (C_{2}O) is a molecule that contains two carbon atoms and one oxygen atom. It is a linear molecule which, because of its simplicity, is of interest in a variety of areas. It is, however, so extremely reactive that it is not encountered in everyday life. It is a carbene, an allene, and an oxocarbon.

== Occurrence ==
Dicarbon monoxide is a product of the photolysis of carbon suboxide:

C_{3}O_{2} → CO + C_{2}O

It is stable enough to observe reactions with NO and NO_{2}.

Called ketenylidene in organometallic chemistry, it is a ligand observed in metal carbonyl clusters, e.g. [Co_{3}(CO)_{9}CCO]^{+} (a modified methylidynetricobaltnonacarbonyl). Ketenylidenes are proposed as intermediates in the chain growth mechanism of the Fischer–Tropsch process, which converts carbon monoxide and hydrogen into hydrocarbon fuels.

The organophosphorus compound (triphenylphosphoranylidene)ketene (C_{6}H_{5})_{3}PCCO (CAS# 15596-07-3) contains one CCO functional group. Sometimes called Bestmann ylide, it is a yellow solid.
