= Ethylene dione =

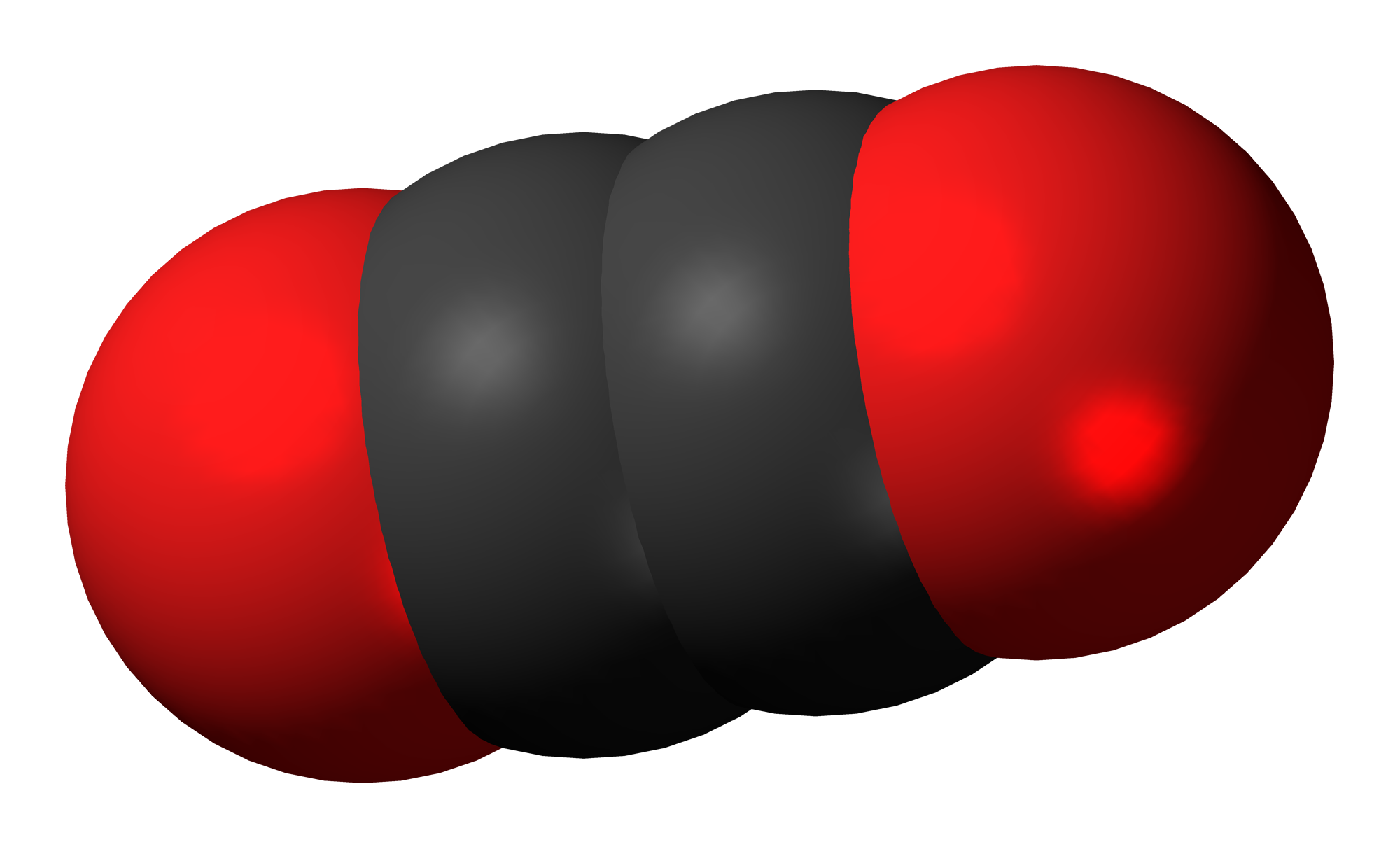

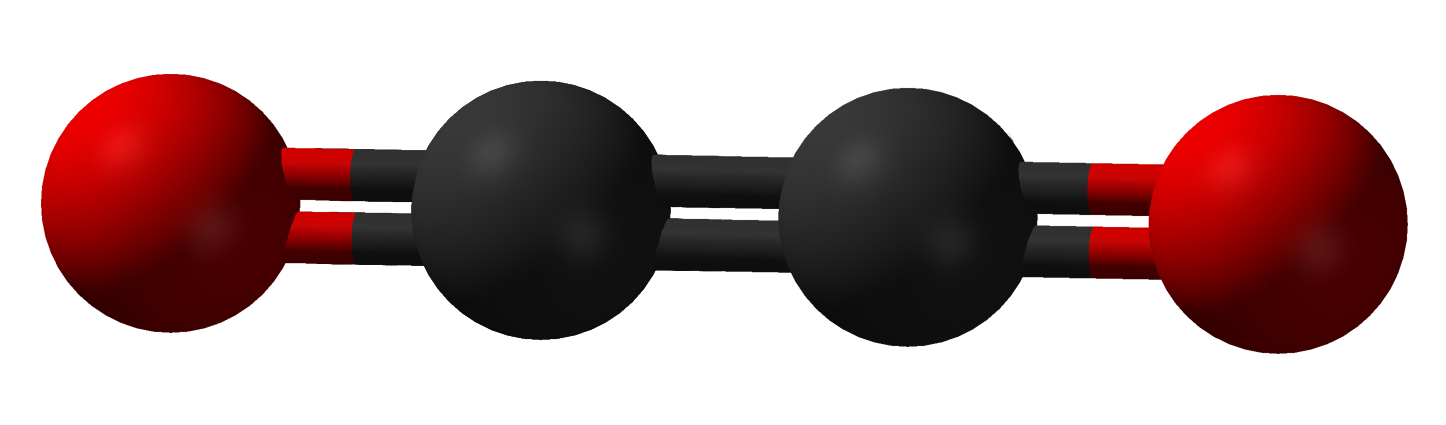

Names
- IUPAC name Ethene-1,2-dione
- Systematic IUPAC name Ethenedione
- Other names: Dicarbon dioxide; Dimeric carbon monoxide; Dimeric carbonous oxide; Dimeric carbon(II) oxide; Ethylenedione; Oxygen percarbide

Identifiers
CAS Number	4363-38-6
3D model (JSmol)	Interactive image
ChemSpider	278619
PubChem CID	314937
UNII	P4RWY4EEW6
CompTox Dashboard (EPA)	DTXSID80311020
- InChI: InChI=1S/C2O2/c3-1-2-4 Key: FONOSWYYBCBQGN-UHFFFAOYSA-N
- SMILES: O=C=C=O

Properties
Chemical formula	C_{2}O_{2}
Molar mass	56.020 g·mol^{−1}
- Except where otherwise noted, data are given for materials in their standard state (at 25 °C [77 °F], 100 kPa). Infobox references

Ethylene dione or ethylenedione, also called dicarbon dioxide, carbon peroxide, ethenedione, or ethene-1,2-dione, is a chemical compound with the formula C_{2}O_{2} or O=C=C=O. It is an oxide of carbon (an oxocarbon), and can be described as the carbon-carbon covalent dimer of carbon monoxide. It can also be thought of as the dehydrated form of glyoxylic acid (H(C=O)COOH), or a ketone of ethenone H_{2}C=C=O.

== Synthesis attempts ==
The existence of ethylenedione was first suggested in 1913. However, for over a century the compound had eluded all attempts to synthesize and observe it, and it came to be considered a purely hypothetical compound, or at best an "exceedingly coy molecule".

In 2015, a research group reported the creation of ethylenedione — by using laser light to eject an electron from the corresponding stable singly-charged anion C_{2}O^{−}_{2} — and its spectroscopic characterization. However, the reported spectrum was later found to match that of the oxyallyl diradical, (H_{2}C^{•})_{2}CO, formed by rearrangement or disproportionation under the high-energy experimental conditions rather than simple electron loss.

== Theoretical investigations ==
Despite the existence of the closed-shell Kekulé structure, O=C=C=O, the lowest bound state of ethyledione is a triplet. It would then be a diradical, with an electronic structure motif similar to the oxygen molecule. However, when the molecule is distorted away from its equilibrium geometry, the potential surfaces of the triplet and singlet states intersect, allowing for intersystem crossing to the singlet state, which is unbound and dissociates to two ground-state CO molecules. The timescale of the intersystem crossing was predicted to be 0.5 ns, making triplet ethylenedione a transient, yet spectroscopically long-lived molecule.

On the other hand, the monoanion of ethylenedione, OCCO^{−}, as well as the dianion C_{2}O^{2−}_{2}, called acetylenediolate, are both stable.

Recent theoretical computations suggest that the in situ preparation and characterization of ethylenedione may be possible through low-energy free-electron induced single-molecule engineering.

== Koch's glyoxylide ==
In the 1940s, Detroit physician William Frederick Koch claimed that he had synthesized this compound, which he called glyoxylide, and that it was an antidote to the toxins that caused a long list of ailments, including diabetes and cancer. The claims were false and the drug was classified as a fraud by the FDA.

== See also ==
- Cyclohexanehexone C_{6}O_{6}, also called triquinoyl, formally a trimer of ethylene dione.
- Oxocarbons
