= Carbon subsulfide =

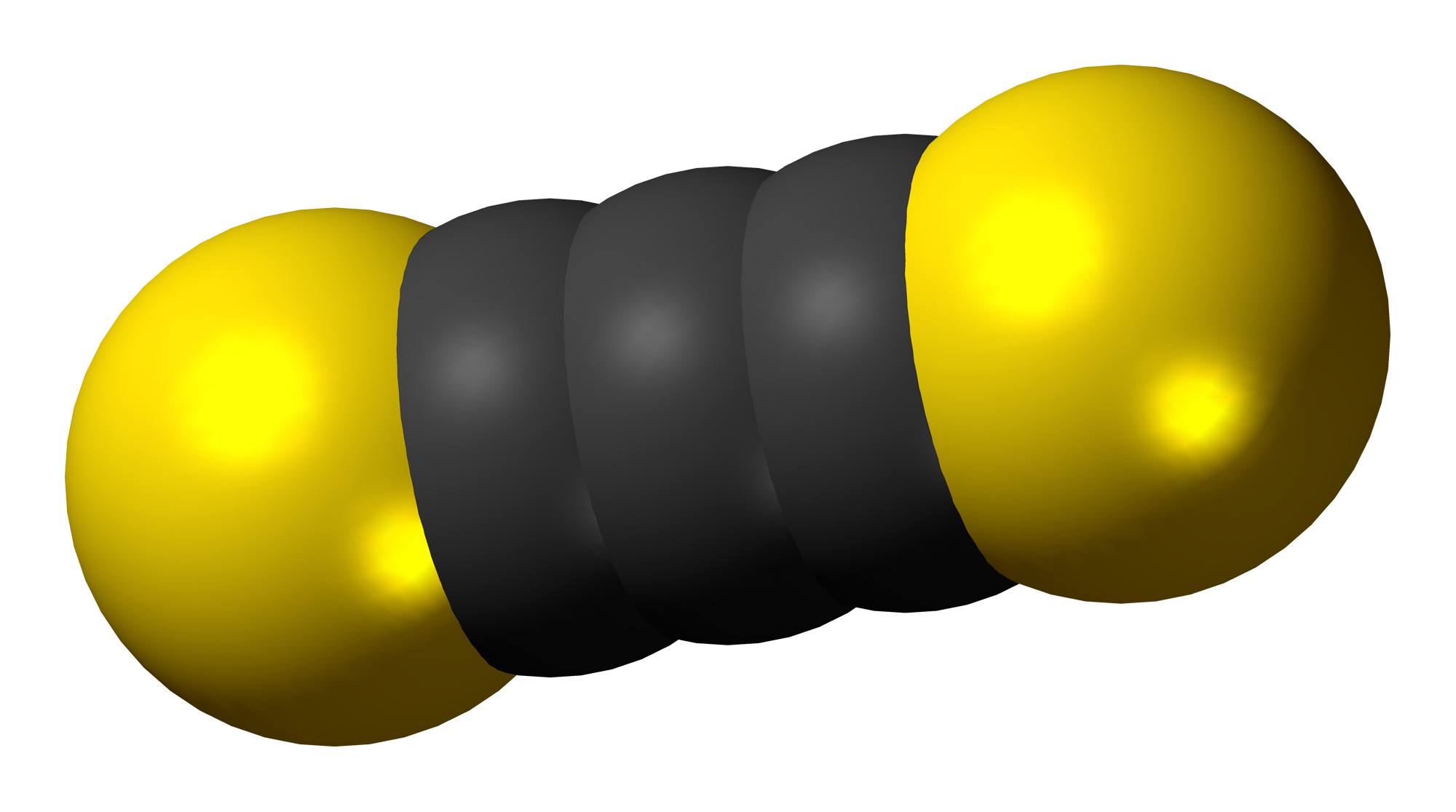

Names
- Preferred IUPAC name Propa-1,2-diene-1,3-dithione
- Other names Carbon Subsulfide, Tricarbon Disulfide

Identifiers
CAS Number	627-34-9
3D model (JSmol)	Interactive image
ChemSpider	9237470
PubChem CID	11062317
UNII	RY6PA94BL3
CompTox Dashboard (EPA)	DTXSID20453695
- InChI: InChI=1S/C3S2/c4-2-1-3-5 Key: RMCQREAPGZPWGK-UHFFFAOYSA-N; InChI=1/C3S2/c4-2-1-3-5 Key: RMCQREAPGZPWGK-UHFFFAOYAC
- SMILES: S=C=C=C=S

Properties
Chemical formula	C_{3}S_{2}
Molar mass	100.15 g·mol^{−1}
Appearance	bright red liquid
Odor	stifling
Density	1.319 g·cm^{−3}
Melting point	−0.5 °C (31.1 °F; 272.6 K)
Boiling point	Decomposes at 90 °C (194 °F; 363 K)
Solubility in water	insoluble

Related compounds
Related compounds	Carbon suboxide Carbon disulfide Ethenedithione
- Except where otherwise noted, data are given for materials in their standard state (at 25 °C [77 °F], 100 kPa). verify (what is ?) Infobox references

Carbon subsulfide is an organic, sulfur-containing chemical compound with the formula C_{3}S_{2} and structure S=C=C=C=S. This deep red liquid is immiscible with water but soluble in organic solvents. It readily polymerizes at room temperature to form a hard black solid.

== Synthesis and structure ==
C_{3}S_{2} was discovered by Béla Lengyel, who assigned it an unsymmetrical structure. Later, infrared and Raman spectroscopy showed that the structure is symmetrical with a D_{∞h} point group symmetry, i.e. S=C=C=C=S. This compound is analogous to carbon suboxide whose structure is O=C=C=C=O.

Lengyel first synthesized this compound by passing carbon disulfide (CS_{2}) vapor through an electric arc with carbon electrodes. This treatment produced a black solution that after filtration and evaporation gave a cherry-red liquid. He determined the molecular mass by cryoscopy. Later preparations of C_{3}S_{2} include thermolysis of a stream of CS_{2} in a quartz tube heated to 900 to 1100 °C as well as flash vacuum pyrolysis (FVP) of 1,2-dithiole-3-thiones.

== Reactions and occurrence ==
Among its few known reactions, C_{3}S_{2} reacts with bromine to form the cyclic disulfide.

C_{3}S_{2} polymerizes under applied pressure to give a black semi-conducting solid. A similar pressure-induced polymerization of CS_{2} also gives a black semiconducting polymer.

In addition, reactions of C_{3}S_{2} can yield highly condensed sulfur-containing compounds, e.g. the reaction of C_{3}S_{2} with 2-aminopyridine.

Using microwave spectroscopy, small C_{n}S_{2} clusters have been detected in interstellar medium. The rotational transitions of these molecular carbon sulfides matched with the corresponding molecules.
