= Carbon suboxide =

- Stick model of carbon suboxide

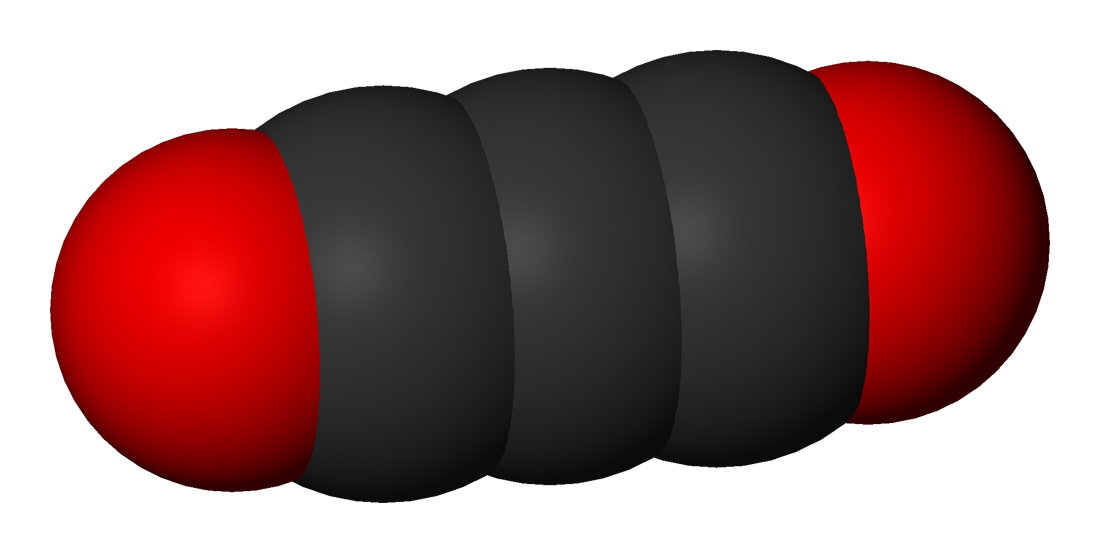
- Spacefill model of carbon suboxide

Names
- Preferred IUPAC name Propa-1,2-diene-1,3-dione

Identifiers
CAS Number	504-64-3
3D model (JSmol)	Interactive image
ChEBI	CHEBI:30086
ChemSpider	120106
MeSH	Carbon+suboxide
PubChem CID	136332
UNII	9M2M4H5WEJ
CompTox Dashboard (EPA)	DTXSID70198443
- InChI: InChI=1S/C3O2/c4-2-1-3-5 Key: GNEVIACKFGQMHB-UHFFFAOYSA-N; InChI=1/C3O2/c4-2-1-3-5 Key: GNEVIACKFGQMHB-UHFFFAOYAU
- SMILES: O=C=C=C=O

Properties
Chemical formula	C_{3}O_{2}
Molar mass	68.031 g·mol^{−1}
Appearance	colorless gas
Odor	strong, pungent odor
Density	3.0 kg/m^{3}, gas; 1.114 g/cm^{3}, liquid
Melting point	−111.3 °C (−168.3 °F; 161.8 K)
Boiling point	6.8 °C (44.2 °F; 279.9 K)
Solubility in water	reacts
Solubility	soluble in 1,4-dioxane, ether, xylene, CS_{2}, tetrahydrofuran
Refractive index (n_{D})	1.4538 (6 °C (43 °F))
Dipole moment	0 D

Structure
Crystal structure	rhombic
Molecular shape	quasilinear (phase dependent)

Thermochemistry
Heat capacity (C)	66.99 J⋅mol^{−1}·K^{-1}
Std molar entropy (S^{⦵}_{298})	276.1 J⋅mol^{−1}·K^{-1}
Std enthalpy of formation (Δ_{f}H^{⦵}_{298})	−93.6 kJ⋅mol^{−1}

Related compounds
Related oxides	carbon dioxide; carbon monoxide; dicarbon monoxide
Related compounds	carbon subsulfide; carbon subnitride
- Except where otherwise noted, data are given for materials in their standard state (at 25 °C [77 °F], 100 kPa). verify (what is ?) Infobox references

Carbon suboxide, or tricarbon dioxide, is an organic, oxygen-containing chemical compound with formula C_{3}O_{2} and structure O=C=C=C=O. Its 4 cumulative double bonds make it a cumulene. It is one of the stable members of the series of linear oxocarbons O=C_{n}=O, which also includes carbon dioxide (CO_{2}) and pentacarbon dioxide (C_{5}O_{2}). Although if carefully purified it can exist at room temperature in the dark without decomposing, it will polymerize under certain situations.

The substance was discovered in 1873 by Benjamin Brodie by subjecting carbon monoxide to an electric current. He claimed that the product was part of a series of "oxycarbons" with formulas C_{x+1}O_{x}, namely C_{2}O, C_{3}O_{2}, C_{4}O_{3}, C_{5}O_{4}, …, and to have identified the last two; however, only C_{3}O_{2} is known. In 1891 Marcellin Berthelot observed that heating pure carbon monoxide at about 550 °C created small amounts of carbon dioxide but no trace of carbon, and assumed that a carbon-rich oxide was created instead, which he named "sub-oxide". He assumed it was the same product obtained by electric discharge and proposed the formula C_{2}O. Otto Diels later stated that the more organic names dicarbonylmethane and dioxallene were also correct.

It is commonly described as an oily liquid or gas at room temperature with an extremely noxious odor.

== Synthesis ==
It is synthesized by warming a dry mixture of phosphorus pentoxide (P_{4}O_{10}) and malonic acid (C_{3}H_{4}O_{4}) or its esters:

C_{3}H_{4}O_{4}C_{3}O_{2} + 2 H_{2}O

Therefore, it can be also considered as the anhydride of malonic anhydride, i.e. the "second anhydride" of malonic acid.

Several other ways for synthesis and reactions of carbon suboxide can be found in a review from 1930 by Reyerson.

== Polymerization ==
Carbon suboxide polymerizes spontaneously to a red, yellow, or black solid. The structure is postulated to be poly(α-pyronic), similar to the structure in 2-pyrone (α-pyrone). The number of monomers in the polymers is variable (see Oxocarbon#Polymeric carbon oxides). In 1969, it was hypothesized that the color of the Martian surface was caused by this compound; this was disproved by the Viking Mars probes (the red color is instead due to iron oxide).

== Uses ==
Carbon suboxide is used in the preparation of malonates; and as an auxiliary to improve the dye affinity of furs.

In chemical synthesis, carbon suboxide is a 1,3-dipole, reacting with alkenes to make 1,3‑cyclopentadiones. Because it is so unstable, it is a reagent of last resort.

== Biological role ==
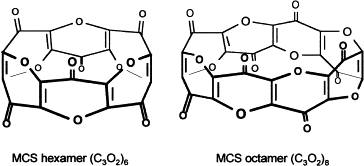
The structures of 6- and 8-ring macrocyclic polymers of carbon suboxide that have been found in living organisms.

Carbon suboxide,C_{3}O_{2}, can be produced in small amounts in any biochemical process that normally produces carbon monoxide, CO, for example, during heme oxidation by heme oxygenase-1. It can also be formed from malonic acid. It has been shown that carbon suboxide in an organism can quickly polymerize into macrocyclic polycarbon structures with the common formula (C_{3}O_{2})_{n} (mostly (C_{3}O_{2})_{6} and (C_{3}O_{2})_{8}), and that those macrocyclic compounds are potent inhibitors of Na^{+}/K^{+}-ATP-ase and Ca-dependent ATP-ase, and have digoxin-like physiological properties and natriuretic and antihypertensive actions. Those macrocyclic carbon suboxide polymer compounds are thought to be endogenous digoxin-like regulators of Na^{+}/K^{+}-ATP-ases and Ca-dependent ATP-ases, and endogenous natriuretics and antihypertensives. Other than that, some authors think also that those macrocyclic compounds of carbon suboxide can possibly diminish free radical formation and oxidative stress and play a role in endogenous anticancer protective mechanisms, for example in the retina.

== Structure and bonding ==
The structure of carbon suboxide has been the subject of experiments and computations since the 1970s. The central issue is the question of whether the molecule is linear or bent (i.e., whether 𝜃_{C_{2}} = ∠ C_{1}C_{2}C_{3} 180°). Studies generally agree that the molecule is highly non-rigid, with a very shallow barrier to bending. According to one study, the molecular geometry is described by a double-well potential with a minimum at 𝜃_{C_{2}} ~ 160°, an inversion barrier of 20 cm^{−1} (0.057 kcal/mol (0.24 kJ/mol)), and a total energy change of 80 cm^{−1} (0.23 kcal/mol (0.96 kJ/mol)) for 140° ≤ 𝜃_{C_{2}} ≤ 180°. The small energetic barrier to bending is around the same order of magnitude as the vibrational zero-point energy. Therefore, the molecule is best described as quasilinear. While infrared and electron diffraction studies have indicated that C_{3}O_{2} has a bent structure in the gas phase, the compound was found to possess at least an average linear geometry in the solid phase by X-ray crystallography, although the large thermal ellipsoids of the oxygen atoms and C_{2} have been interpreted to be consistent with rapid bending (minimum 𝜃_{C_{2}} ~ 170°), even in the solid state.

A heterocumulene resonance form of carbon suboxide based on minimization of formal charges does not readily explain the molecule's non-rigidity and deviation from linearity. To account for the quasilinear structure of carbon suboxide, Frenking has proposed that carbon suboxide be regarded as a "coordination complex" of carbon(0) bearing two carbonyl ligands and two lone pairs: OC:→←:CO. However, the contribution of dative bonding in C_{3}O_{2} and similar species has been criticized as chemically unreasonable by others.

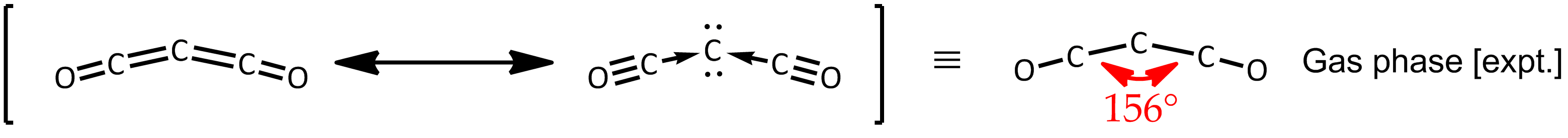
