= Benzene polycarboxylic acid =

A benzene polycarboxylic acid is a derivative of benzene with two or more carboxylic acid functional groups. These compounds have the chemical formula C_{6+n}H_{6}O_{2n} or C_{6}H_{6−n}(COOH)_{n}.

- Benzenedicarboxylic acid, $n=2$, three isomers:
  - Isophthalic acid (1,2-benzenedicarboxylic acid)
  - Phthalic acid (1,3-benzenedicarboxylic acid)
  - Terephthalic acid (1,4-benzenedicarboxylic acid)
- Benzenetricarboxylic acid, $n=3$, three isomers:
  - Hemimellitic acid (1,2,3-benzenetricarboxylic acid)
  - Trimellitic acid (1,2,4-benzenetricarboxylic acid)
  - Trimesic acid (1,3,5-benzenetricarboxylic acid)
- Benzenetetracarboxylic acid, $n=4$, three isomers:
  - 1,2,3,4-benzenetetracarboxylic acid
  - 1,2,3,5-benzenetetracarboxylic acid
  - Pyromellitic acid (1,2,4,5-benzenetetracarboxylic acid)
- Benzenepentacarboxylic acid, $n=5$
- Mellitic acid (benzenehexacarboxylic acid), $n=6$
