= C9H6O6 =

The molecular formula C_{9}H_{6}O_{6} may refer to:

- Hemimellitic acid (benzene-1,2,3-tricarboxylic acid)
- Trimellitic acid (benzene-1,2,4-tricarboxylic acid)
- Trimesic acid (benzene-1,3,5-tricarboxylic acid)
