= BTCS =

BTCs or BTCS may refer to:

- BTCs
  - Bitcoins
  - BTCS Inc.
  - Brachytherapy catheters (for brachytherapy in bladder cancer)
- BTCS
  - Before These Crowded Streets, an album by the Dave Matthews Band

== See also ==
- BTC (disambiguation)
