= Graphitic acid =

Graphitic acid may refer to:

- Graphite oxide
- Mellitic acid
