= HyperVerse =

Defunct cryptocurrency Ponzi scheme

- Formerly: HyperFund, HyperTech, HyperCapital, HyperNation
- Industry: Cryptocurrency
- Founded: 2020
- Founders: Sam Lee; Zijing "Ryan" Xu
- Defunct: 2022
- Fate: Defunct (charged with fraud as a Ponzi scheme)
- Key people: Steven Reece Lewis (fictional CEO)
- Revenue: ▼$1.89 billion (estimated investor losses)

HyperVerse is a defunct cryptocurrency hedge fund (formerly HyperNation, then HyperFund, then HyperVerse in 2021). The collapse of the company resulted in approximately $1.3 billion in customer losses.

== History and operation ==
HyperVerse was established by Sam Lee and Zijing "Ryan" Xu, who were previously known for founding Blockchain Global, a collapsed Australian bitcoin company that went into administration in 2021, owing creditors $58 million. Operating initially under the name HyperFund in mid-2020, the platform sold "memberships" to the public. Promotional materials claimed that investors would receive between 0.5% and 1% in daily passive rewards until their initial investment was doubled or tripled (a 300% return over 600 days). To convince investors that HyperFund could sustain such payments, the company claimed its payouts were funded by revenues from large-scale cryptocurrency mining operations. In reality, these mining operations did not exist.

In December 2021, at the peak of the Metaverse hype, HyperFund was rebranded and "migrated" to HyperVerse. The promoters marketed HyperVerse as a virtual blockchain community that would eventually rival Facebook. Investors were required to buy memberships with a minimum of $300 USD, which were then converted into internal tokens called "HyperUnits". The scheme utilized a multi-level marketing structure, granting investors higher "star rankings" (such as "VIP5 STAR") based on the number of new members they successfully recruited into the ecosystem.

== Fake executive controversy ==
In December 2021, a global launch video introduced "Steven Reece Lewis" as the CEO of HyperVerse. Promotional materials claimed that Lewis held degrees from the University of Leeds and the University of Cambridge, had previously worked for Goldman Sachs, had sold a web development company to Adobe, and had been headhunted by the HyperTech group. Subsequent investigations by journalists in 2024 revealed that Steven Reece Lewis did not exist, with the universities, Goldman Sachs, and Adobe having no record of him. It was later uncovered that the "CEO" was actually a British freelance television presenter named Stephen Harrison, who had been paid $4,000 and given a script to act as the head of the company for promotional videos.

The scheme also utilized videos from celebrities, including actor Chuck Norris and Apple co-founder Steve Wozniak, to enthusiastically endorse the platform. These endorsements were later discovered to have been purchased through the celebrity video-sharing website Cameo.

== Collapse and regulatory action ==
Starting in at least July 2021, HyperFund began blocking investor withdrawals, leaving users unable to access their funds. Despite this, the promoters continued to solicit new investments under the HyperVerse and later HyperNation names. The blockchain analysis firm Chainalysis ranked HyperVerse as the largest cryptocurrency scam of 2022, initially estimating global investor losses at $1.3 billion, though U.S. authorities later placed the fraud's total scale at $1.89 billion. The scheme aggressively targeted communities in developing countries, leading to devastating financial impacts for retail investors.

== Legal proceedings ==
At the end of January 2024, the US Department of Justice charged Australian entrepreneur Sam Lee, chairman of HyperTech—the company that operated HyperVerse—with conspiracy to commit fraud in the District Court of Maryland.

== See also ==
- BitConnect
- Cryptocurrency and crime
- List of Ponzi schemes
- OneCoin
