= Polyamide-imide =

Class of polymers

Polyamide-imides are either thermosetting or thermoplastic, amorphous polymers that have exceptional mechanical, thermal and chemical resistant properties. Polyamide-imides are used extensively as wire coatings in making magnet wire. They are prepared from isocyanates and TMA (trimellic acid-anhydride) in N-methyl-2-pyrrolidone (NMP). A prominent distributor of polyamide-imides is Solvay Specialty Polymers, which uses the trademark Torlon.

Polyamide-imides display a combination of properties from both polyamides and polyimides, such as high strength, melt processibility, exceptional high heat capability, and broad chemical resistance. Polyamide-imide polymers can be processed into a wide variety of forms, from injection or compression molded parts and ingots, to coatings, films, fibers and adhesives. Generally these articles reach their maximum properties with a subsequent thermal cure process.

Other high-performance polymers in this same realm are polyetheretherketones and polyimides.

== Chemistry ==
The currently popular commercial methods to synthesize polyamide-imides are the acid chloride route and the isocyanate route.

=== Acid chloride route ===
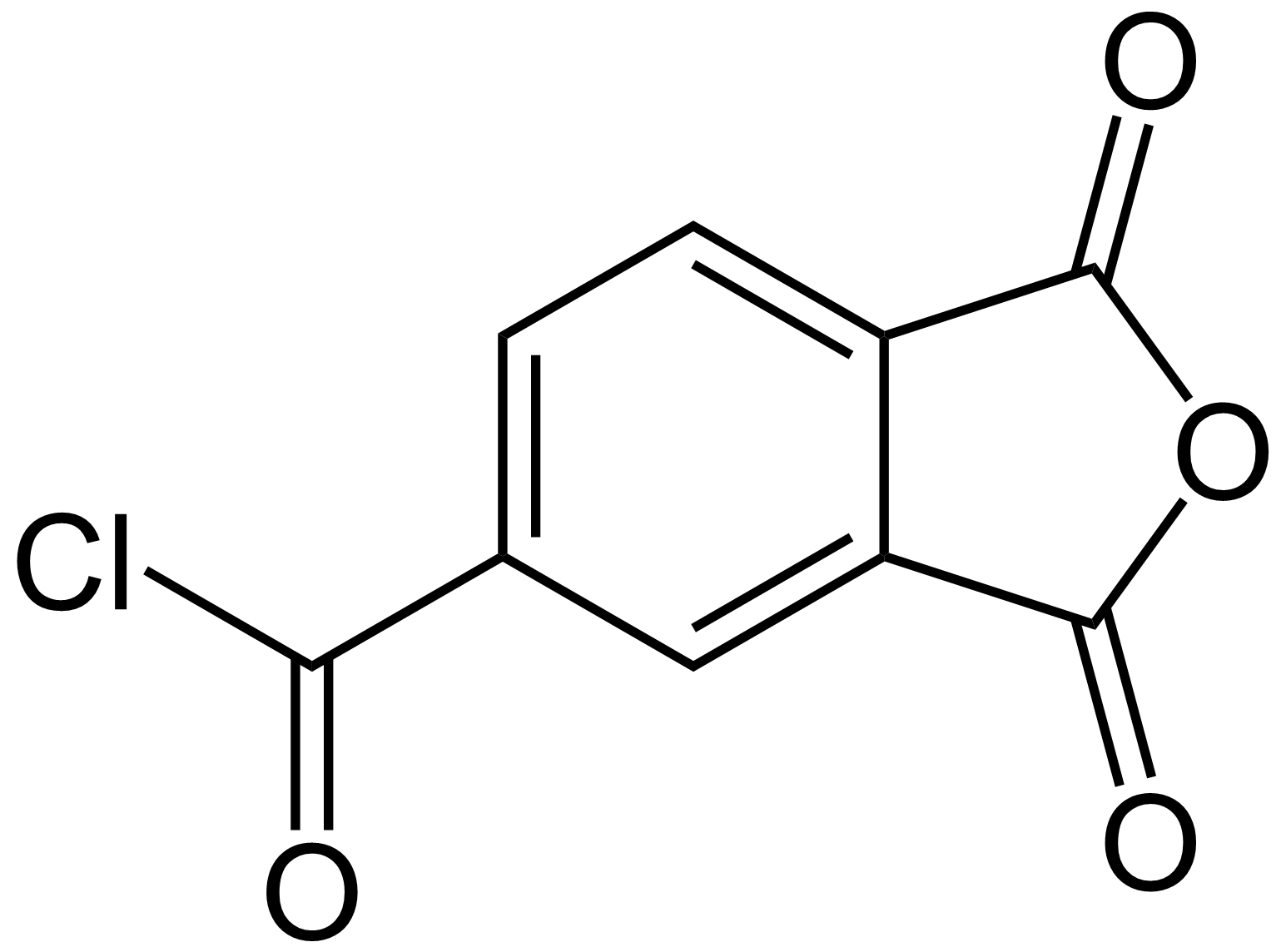
Trimellitic acid chloride

Methylene dianiline

The earliest route to polyamide-imides is the condensation of an aromatic diamine, such as methylene dianiline (MDA) and trimellitic acid chloride (TMAC). Reaction of the anhydride with the diamine produces an intermediate amic acid. The acid chloride functionality reacts with the aromatic amine to give the amide bond and hydrochloric acid (HCl) as a by-product. In the commercial preparation of polyamideimides, the polymerization is carried out in a dipolar, aprotic solvent such as N-methylpyrrolidone (NMP), dimethylacetamide (DMAC), dimethylformamide (DMF), or dimethylsulfoxide (DMSO) at temperatures between 20 and 60 °C (68 and 140 °F). The byproduct HCl must be neutralized in situ or removed by washing it from the precipitated polymer. Further thermal treatment of the polyamideimide polymer increases molecular weight and causes the amic acid groups to form imides with the evolution of water.

=== Diisocyanate route ===
This is the primary route to polyamide-imides which are used as wire enamels. A diisocyanate, often 4,4’-methylenediphenyldiisocyanate (MDI), is reacted with trimellitic anhydride (TMA). The product achieved at the end of this process is a high molecular weight, fully imidized polymer solution with no condensation byproducts, since the carbon dioxide gas byproduct is easily removed. This form is convenient for the manufacture of wire enamel or coatings. The solution viscosity is controlled by stoichiometry, monofunctional reagents, and polymer solids. The typical polymer solids level is 35-45% and it may be diluted further by the supplier or user with diluents.

== Fabrication ==
Polyamide-imides are commercially used for coatings and molded articles.

=== Coatings ===
The product used mainly for coatings is sold in a powdered form and is roughly 50% imidized. One of the major uses is as a magnet wire enamel. The magnet wire enamel is made by dissolving the PAI powder in a strong, aprotic solvent such as N-methyl pyrrolidone. Diluents and other additives can be added to provide the correct viscosity for application to the copper or aluminum conductor. Application is typically done by drawing the conductor through a bath of enamel and then through a die to control coating thickness. The wire is then passed through an oven to drive off the solvent and cure the coating. The wire usually is passed through the process several times to achieve the desired coating thickness.

The PAI enamel is very thermally stable as well as abrasion and chemical resistant. PAI is often used over polyester wire enamels to achieve higher thermal ratings.

PAI is also used in decorative, corrosion resistant coatings for industrial uses, often in conjunction with fluoropolymers. The PAI aids in adhering the fluoropolymer to the metal substrate. They also find usage in non-stick cookware coatings. While solvents can be used, some water-borne systems are used. These are possible because the amide-imide contains acid functionality.

=== Molded or machined articles ===
The polyamide-imides used for molded articles are also based on aromatic diamines and trimellitic acid chloride, but the diamines are different from those used in the products used for coatings and the polymer is more fully imidized prior to compounding and pelletizing. Resins for injection molding include unreinforced, glass-fiber reinforced, carbon fiber reinforced, and wear resistant grades. These resins are sold at a relatively low molecular weight so they can be melt processed by extrusion or injection-molding. The molded articles are then thermally treated for several days at temperatures up to 260 °C (500 °F). During this treatment, commonly referred to a postcure, the molecular weight increases through chain extension and the polymer gets much stronger and more chemically resistant. Prior to postcure, parts can be reground and reprocessed. After postcure, reprocessing is not practical.

== Properties of molded PAI ==
Property	Test method	Units	Molded PAI
Tensile strength, ultimate	ASTM D 638	MPa, average value	91.6
Tensile modulus	ASTM D 638	GPa, average value	3.97
Tensile elongation	ASTM D 638	%	3.15
Flexural strength	ASTM D 790	MPa	133
Flexural modulus	ASTM D 638	GPa	4.58
Compressive strength	ASTM D 695	MPa, average	132
Izod impact strength	ASTM D 256	J/m (ft-lb/in) average	0.521 (1)
Heat deflection temperature @ 264 psi	ASTM D 648	°C (°F)	273 (523)
Coefficient of linear thermal expansion	ASTM D 696	ppm/°C	37.7
Volume resistivity	ASTM D 257	ohm-cm, average	8.10×10^{12}
Density	ASTM D 792	g/cm^{3}	1.48
Water absorption, 24 hr	ASTM D 570	%	0.35

=== High-strength grades only ===
Property	Test method	Units	Neat PAI	30% GF PAI	30% CF PAI
Tensile strength	ASTM D 638	MPa (kpsi)	152 (22.0)	221 (32.1)	221 (32.0)
Tensile modulus	ASTM D 638	GPa (kpsi)	4.5 (650)	14.5 (2,110)	16.5 (2,400)
Tensile elongation	ASTM D 638	%	7.6	2.3	1.5
Flexural strength	ASTM D 790	MPa (kpsi)	241 (34.9)	333 (48.3)	350 (50.7)
Flexural modulus	ASTM D 790	GPa (kpsi)	5.0 (730)	11.7 (1,700)	16.5 (2,400)
Compressive strength	ASTM D 695	MPa (kpsi)	221 (32.1)	264 (38.3)	254 (36.9)
Shear strength	ASTM D 732	MPa (kpsi)	128 (18.5)	139 (20.1)	119 (17.3)
Izod impact strength	ASTM D 256	J/m (ftlb/in)	144 (2.7)	80 (1.5)	48 (0.9)
Izod impact strength, unnotched	ASTM D 4812	J/m (ftlb/in)	1070 (20)	530 (10)	320 (6)
Heat deflection temperature @ 264 psi	ASTM D 648	°C (°F)	278 (532)	282 (540)	282 (540)
Coefficient linear thermal Expansion	ASTM D 696	ppm/°C (ppm/°F)	31 (17)	16 (9)	9 (5)
Volume resistivity	ASTM D 257	ohm-cm	2e17	2e17	
Specific gravity	ASTM D 792		1.42	1.61	1.48
Water absorption, 24 hr	ASTM D 570	%	0.33	0.24	0.26

=== Wear-resistant PAI grades ===
Property	Test method	Units	4275	4301	4435	4630	4645
Tensile strength	ASTM D 638	MPa (kpsi)	117 (16.9)	113 (16.4)	94 (13.6)	81 (11.8)	114 (16.6)
Tensile modulus	ASTM D 638	GPa (kpsi)	8.8 (1,280)	6.8 (990)	14.5 (2,100)	7.4 (1,080)	18.6 (2,700)
Tensile elongation	ASTM D 638	%	2.6	3.3	1.0	1.9	0.8
Flexural strength	ASTM D 790	MPa (kpsi)	208 (30.2)	215 (31.2)	152 (22.0)	131 (19.0)	154 (22.4)
Flexural modulus	ASTM D 790	GPa (kpsi)	7.3 (1.060)	6.9 (1,000)	14.8 (2,150)	6.8 (990)	12.4 (1,800)
Compressive strength	ASTM D 695	MPa (kpsi)	123 (17.8)	166 (24.1)	138 (20.0)	99 (14.4)	157 (22.8)
Izod impact strength, notched	ASTM D 256	J/m (ft-lb/in)	85 (1.6)	64 (1.2)	43 (0.8)	48 (0.9)	37 (0.7)
Izod impact strength, unnotched	ASTM D 4812	J/m (ft-lb/in)	270 (5)	430 (8)	210 (4)	160 (3)	110 (2)
Heat deflection temperature at 264 psi	ASTM D 648	°C (°F)	280 (536)	279 (534)	278 (532)	280 (536)	281 (538)
Coefficient linear thermal expansion	ASTM D 696	ppm/°C (ppm/°F)	25 (14)	25 (14)	14 (8)	16 (9)	9 (3)

== Injection molding ==
Polyamide-imide resin is hygroscopic, and picks up ambient moisture. Before processing the resin, drying is required to avoid brittle parts, foaming, and other molding problems. The resin must be dried to a moisture content of 500 ppm or less. A desiccant dryer capable of maintaining a dew point of −40 °F (−40 °C) is recommended. If drying is done in pans or trays, put the resin in layers no more than 2 to 3 inches (5.1 to 7.6 centimetres) deep in drying trays. Dry for 24 hours at 250 °F (121 °C), 16 hours at 300 °F (149 °C), or 8 hours at 350 °F (177 °C). If drying at 350 °F, limit drying time to 16 hours. For the injection molding press, a desiccant hopper dryer is recommended. The circulating air suction pipe should be at the base of the hopper, as near the feed throat as possible.

In general, modern reciprocating-screw injection molding presses with microprocessor controls capable of closed-loop control are recommended for molding PAI. The press should be fitted with a low compression ratio, constant taper screw. The compression ratio should be between 1.1 and 1.5 to 1, and no check device should be used. The starting mold temperatures are specified as follows:

Zone	Temp, °F	Temp, °C
Feed zone	580	304
Middle zone	620	327
Front zone	650	343
Nozzle	700	371

The mold temperature should be in the range of 325 to 425 °F (163 to 218 °C).

== Other applications ==
The high temperature and chemical resistance of polyamide-imides make them in principle suitable for membrane based gas separations. The separation of contaminants such as CO_{2}, H_{2}S, and other impurities from natural gas wells is an important industrial process. Pressures exceeding 1000 psia demand materials with good mechanical stability. The highly polar H_{2}S and polarizable CO_{2} molecules can strongly interact with the polymer membranes causing swelling and plasticization due to high levels of impurities. Polyamide-imides can resist plasticization because of the strong intermolecular interactions arising from the polyimide functions as well as the ability of the polymer chains to hydrogen bond with one another as a result of the amide bond. Although not currently used in any major industrial separation, polyamide-imides could be used for these types of processes where chemical and mechanical stability are required.

== See also ==
- Plastic automotive engine
