= BTC =

BTC may refer to:

== Organizations ==
- BAL Bashkirian Airlines (ICAO code)
- Behavior Tech Computer, a Taiwanese computer hardware manufacturer
- Belize Trans Colours, a Belizean LGBT rights organisation
- Bodoland Territorial Council
- Botswana Telecommunications Corporation
- British Transport Commission
- BTC (Bahamas), a telecommunications provider
- Bulgarian Telecommunications Company, the former name of Vivacom
- Busan Transportation Corporation, in Busan, South Korea

== Education ==
- Balderstone Technology College
- Baptist Theological College of Southern Africa
- Bellingham Technical College
- Belmont Technical College
- Blackhawk Technical College

== People ==
- Brian Tyler Cohen, a social democratic youtuber

== Places ==
- BTC City, a shopping and other use area in Ljubljana, Slovenia
- Batticaloa Airport (IATA code)
- Britomart Transport Centre, New Zealand
- Bucharest Tower Center, a building in Romania
- Bellevue Transit Center, the busiest bus stop in Washington state
- Blake Transit Center, a public transit hub in Ann Arbor, Michigan
- Balaghat Junction railway station (station code: BTC), Madhya Pradesh, India

== Science and technology ==
=== Biochemistry ===
- Betacellulin, a protein encoded by the BTC gene

=== Chemistry ===
- Trimesic acid, or benzene-1,3,5-tricarboxylic acid, a chemical compound
- Triphosgene, or bis-(trichloromethyl)carbonate, a chemical compound

=== Computing ===
- Bit Test and Complement, an instruction in the X86 instruction set
- Bitcoin (currency symbol: BTC), a cryptocurrency
- Block Truncation Coding, a lossy image compression technique

== Sport ==
- Budapesti TC, Hungarian football team
- Bowerman Track Club, elite distance running group in Oregon, US

== Other uses ==
- Baku–Tbilisi–Ceyhan pipeline, oil pipeline through the Caucasus and Turkey
- Bati language (Cameroon), a Niger–Congo language of Cameroon with the ISO 639 code btc
- Bicycle torque coupling
- BTC Touring, specification of racing car formerly used in the British Touring Car Championship
- Busch Tennis Courts, former name of the Millie West Tennis Facility
- Curtiss XBTC, an airplane
