= TMAC =

TMAC, T-MAC or tMAC may refer to:

- Trimellitic anhydride chloride, a chemical compound
- Testis-specific meiotic arrest complex, a protein complex in Drosophila
- TeraMAC, a unit of 10^{12} multiply–accumulate operations (MAC)

== People ==
- Tony MacAlpine (1960), American musician
- Terry McAuliffe (1957), former Governor of Virginia
- Tom McCarthy (sportscaster) (born 1968), American sports announcer
- Tracy McGrady (born 1979), American basketball player
- Tetairoa McMillan (born 2003), American football player
- tobyMac (born 1964), American musician
- Tom MacDonald (rapper) (born 1988), Canadian musician

== See also ==
- T-Mac (disambiguation)
