= Trimellitic acid =

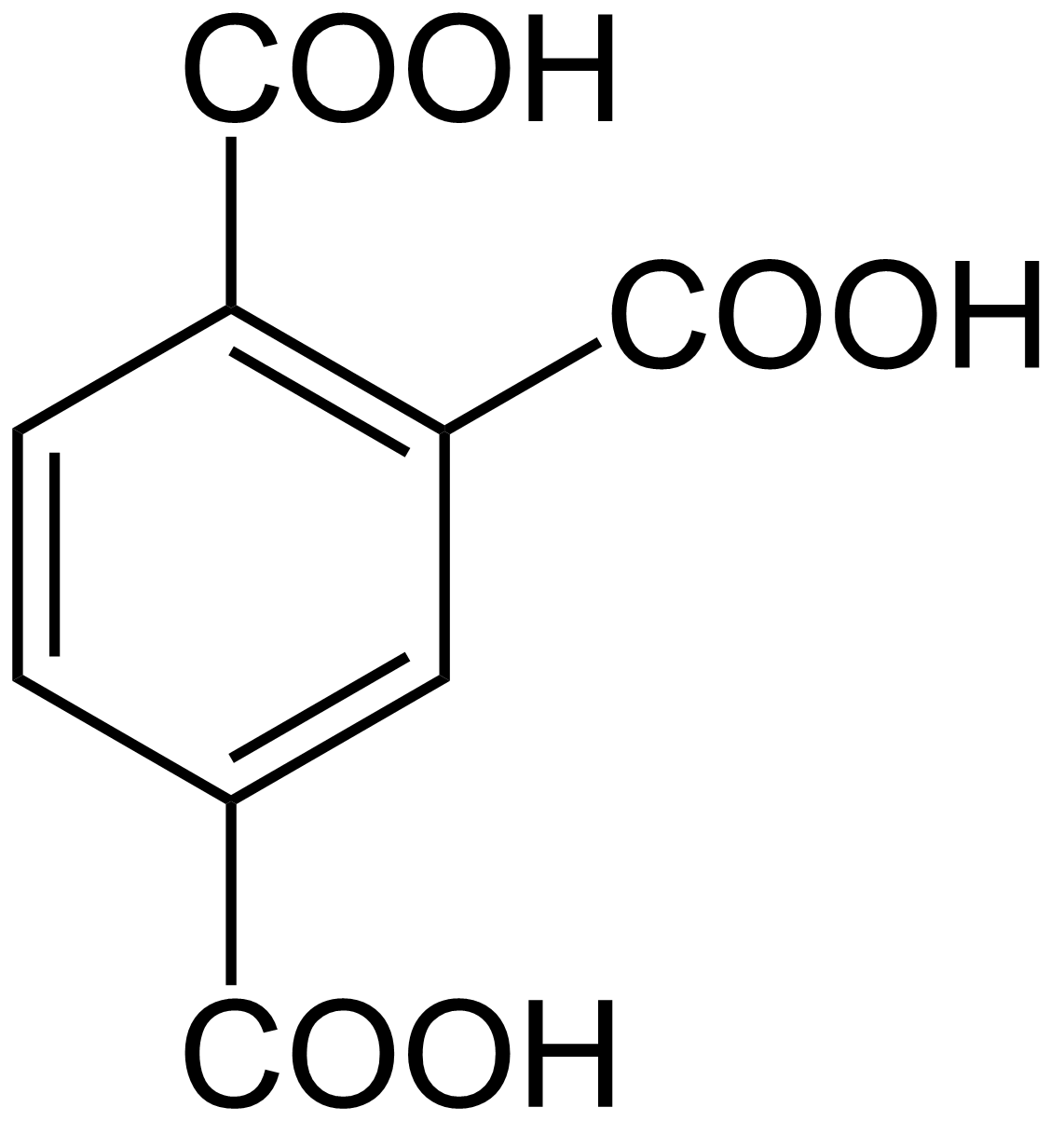

Names
- Preferred IUPAC name Benzene-1,2,4-tricarboxylic acid
- Other names 1,2,4-Benzenetricarboxylic acid; 4-Carboxyphthalic acid; 1,2,4-Tricarboxybenzene

Identifiers
CAS Number	528-44-9
3D model (JSmol)	Interactive image
ChemSpider	10258
ECHA InfoCard	100.007.667
PubChem CID	10708
UNII	7NVY29MQ5F
CompTox Dashboard (EPA)	DTXSID3021487
- InChI: Key: YIWUKEYIRIRTPP-UHFFFAOYSA-N
- SMILES: c1cc(c(cc1C(=O)O)C(=O)O)C(=O)O

Properties
Chemical formula	C_{9}H_{6}O_{6}
Molar mass	210.141 g·mol^{−1}
Appearance	White solid
Melting point	221–222 °C (430–432 °F; 494–495 K)
Solubility in water	21 g/L (0.1M) at 25 °C
log P	2.721
- Except where otherwise noted, data are given for materials in their standard state (at 25 °C [77 °F], 100 kPa). (what is ?) Infobox references

Trimellitic acid (benzene-1,2,4-tricarboxylic acid) is a chemical compound with the molecular formula C_{6}H_{3}(СООН)_{3}. Like the other isomers of benzenetricarboxylic acid, trimellitic acid is a colorless solid. It is prepared by oxidation of 1,2,4-trimethylbenzene.

== Isomers ==
- Hemimellitic acid (benzene-1,2,3-tricarboxylic acid)
- Trimesic acid (benzene-1,3,5-tricarboxylic acid)

== See also ==
- Trimellitic anhydride chloride
- Trimellitic anhydride
- Plasticizer § Trimellitates
- Mellitic acid
