= Blockchain Global =

Defunct crypto exchange

- Formerly: Bitcoin Group (2014–2016)
- Type: Private
- Industry: Cryptocurrency exchange, Bitcoin mining, Blockchain technology
- Founded: 2014; 12 years ago
- Founder: Sam Lee
- Defunct: 2021
- Fate: Collapsed (owing $58 million); former directors investigated in Australia
- Headquarters: Melbourne, Australia
- Key people: Sam Lee (Founder), Allan Guo (Co-founder/Director)
- Services: Cryptocurrency trading, business incubation, blockchain solutions
- Website: ACX.io (defunct)

Blockchain Global was an Australian cryptocurrency exchange based in Melbourne. It was co-founded in 2014 as Bitcoin Group, and in August 2016 was rebranded as Blockchain Global. The company later developed the blockchain exchange platform ACX.io, and in 2017, acquired Digital X Direct. ACX subsequently ceased operations abruptly with customers unable to access their assets in late 2019. Blockchain Global went into voluntary administration in October 2021.

== History ==
=== Bitcoin Group mining operation (2014-2016) ===
Bitcoin Group was founded in 2014 as a bitcoin mining company as a result of a partnership between Sam Lee, Allan Guo and Vincent Vu. As of September 2015, with seven bitcoin mining locations in Australia, China, and Thailand, Bitcoin Group's mining operation generated 6.2 peta hashes, approximately 15.7% of the Global Hash Power.

The company made a submission to the Australian Senate’s Economics References Committee for their 2015 inquiry into digital currencies. The submission advised the committee that while the company did not agree with the ruling on the GST treatment of digital currencies by the Australian Taxation Office, its ambitions would have been more difficult to realize without the regulatory clarity that it provided.

=== Failed IPO (2014-2016) ===
Bitcoin Group announced that it would pursue an initial public offering (IPO) on the Australian Securities Exchange (ASX) in October 2014. The attempt was delayed by two stop orders from the Australian Securities and Investments Commission (ASIC). Following ASIC's request for an Independent Expert Report, the company undertook a third attempt to list on the ASX through an IPO, planning to issue 100 million new shares by January 2016 and thereby raise $20 million at 20¢ a share and achieve a market capitalisation of $32.9 million based on 164,870,930 shares on completion of the offer. Bitcoin Group closed their offer on 25 January 2016 after raising $5.9 million, less than a third of the target, and in March 2016 withdrew the offer and refunded subscribers after ASX deemed their liquidity insufficient. The company said the capital report by an independent accounting firm which the exchange had required did not take into account the expected rise in bitcoin prices following block halving in July 2016.

=== Blockchain Global and ACX Exchange (2016-2019) ===
In August 2016 Bitcoin Group rebranded as Blockchain Global to reflect a broadened focus including management consulting and business incubation. In 2016, the company generated around US$4.4 million in revenue. After the company developed the blockchain exchange platform ACX.io; in February 2017 it reached an agreement with Digital X to take over the function of that company's blockchain exchange platform, Digital X Direct. In July 2017, Blockchain Global had roughly US$3.5 million in bitcoin and cash. In August 2017, a potential merger between BTCS and Blockchain Global was announced. By early 2018, it had been delayed.

In late 2019, ACX abruptly ceased operations abruptly with customers unable to access their assets. Sam Lee stepped down as a director in 2019, and was re-appointed CEO in April 2020.

=== Liquidation and investigations (2020-2025) ===
In 2020, Jin Chen sued Blockchain Global for the overdue payments of 117 Bitcoins which was set in the Deed of his exit in mid-2018. In 2021, ACX customers sued Blockchain Global in a separate proceeding for their funds and cryptocurrencies trapped in the collapsed platform ACX.io, also fighting for the ownership of 117 Bitcoins. In September 2021, an Australian supreme court ordered Lee, Guo, and Chen, as well as Blockchain Global and ACX Tech, not to sell or in any way dispose of the coins. The bitcoin at the time were valued at US$8.75 million.

Blockchain Global went into voluntary administration in October 2021. When it went into administration, it owed $21 million to creditors. Lee remained Blockchain Global's CEO. Liquidators were appointed to the company on February 11, 2022. ASIC in January 2024 began investigating company's operation of ACX Exchange, after a report from the firm's liquidators that said that as of October 2, 2023, Blockchain Global owed around US$37 million to creditors. After a travel ban in February 2024 related to the Blockchain Global investigation, Liang Guo left Australia in September 2024 after the travel restraint orders were lifted. In May 2025, ASIC said it had sued ex-director Liang Guo alleging breaches of duty over Blockchain Global's operation of ACX Exchange and its collapse. In October 2025, an Australian federal court barred Blockchain Global's director, Ryan Xu, from leaving the country until December 20, after ASIC applied for the court orders.

== See also ==
- Economics of bitcoin
- List of cryptocurrency trading platforms
- List of bitcoin companies
