= T-Mac =

T-Mac may refer to:

- Tony MacAlpine (born 1960), American musician
- Terry McAuliffe (born 1957), American politician
- Tracy McGrady (born 1979), American basketball player
- Tetairoa McMillan (born 2003), American football player

== See also ==
- TMAC (disambiguation)
