= Trimellitic anhydride chloride =

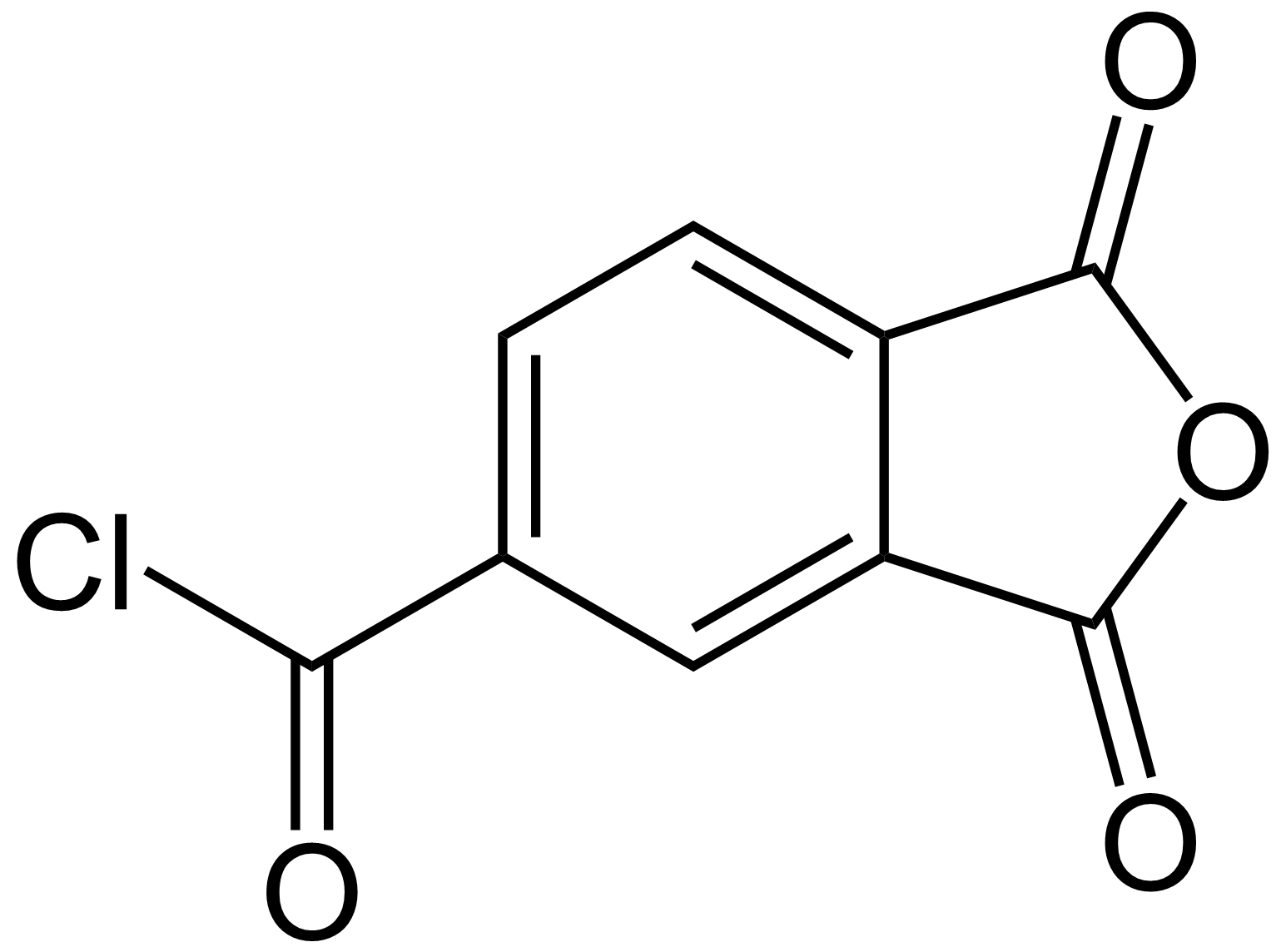
- Structural formula of trimellitic anhydride chloride

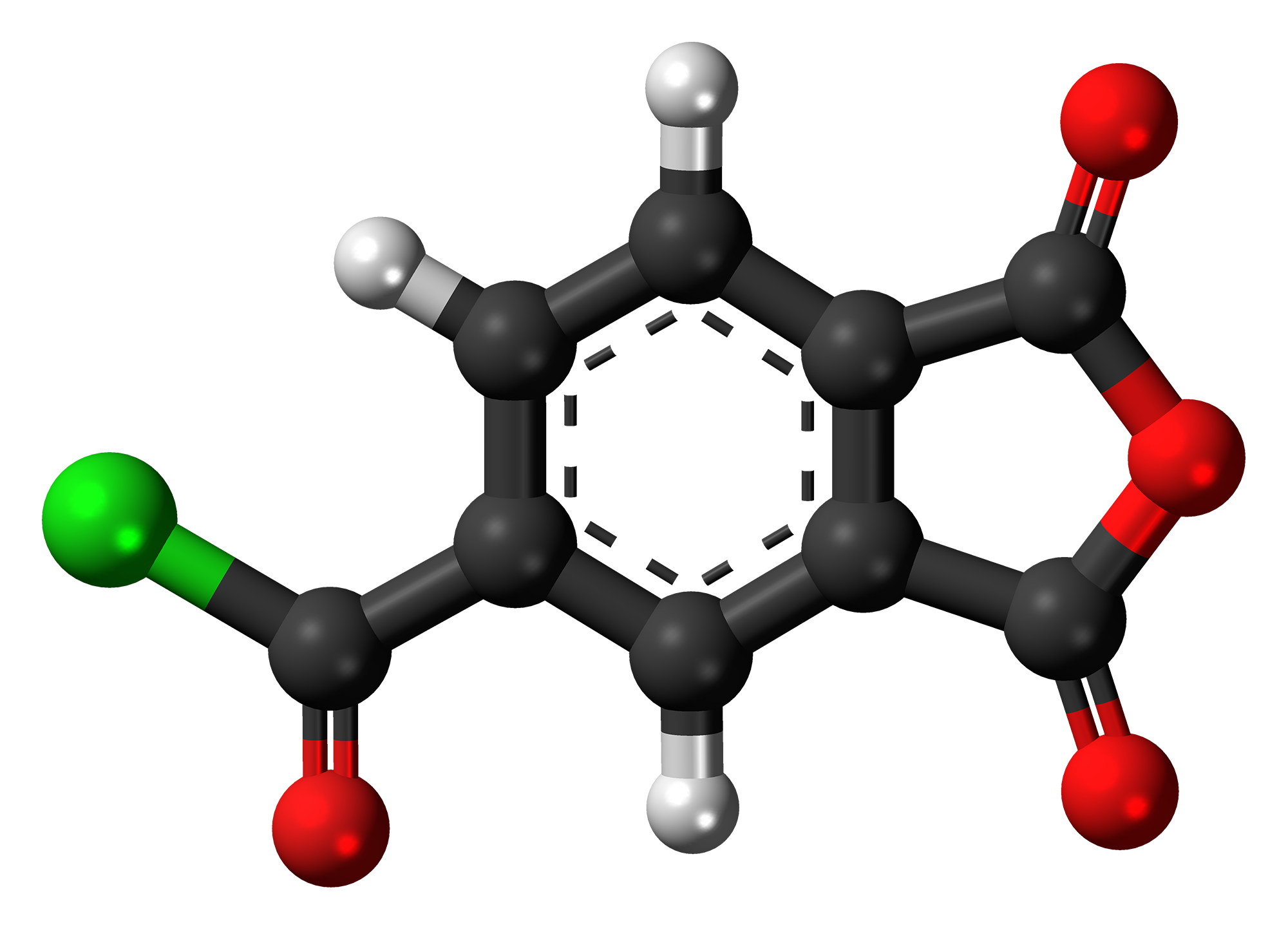

Names
- Preferred IUPAC name 1,3-Dioxo-1,3-dihydro-2-benzofuran-5-carbonyl chloride
- Other names Anhydrotrimellitic acid chloride 4-Chloroformylphthalic anhydride 4-(Chloroformyl)phthalic anhydride Trimellitic acid anhydride chloride Trimellitic anhydride acid chloride Trimellitic anhydride monochloride

Identifiers
CAS Number	1204-28-0
3D model (JSmol)	Interactive image; Interactive image
Abbreviations	TMAC
ChemSpider	64159
ECHA InfoCard	100.013.522
EC Number	214-874-8
PubChem CID	70998
UNII	56231EU26X
UN number	3261
CompTox Dashboard (EPA)	DTXSID9061621
- InChI: InChI=1S/C9H3ClO4/c10-7(11)4-1-2-5-6(3-4)9(13)14-8(5)12/h1-3H Key: NJMOHBDCGXJLNJ-UHFFFAOYSA-N
- SMILES: ClC(=O)C1=CC=C2C(=O)OC(=O)C2=C1; C1=CC2=C(C=C1C(=O)Cl)C(=O)OC2=O

Properties
Chemical formula	C_{9}H_{3}ClO_{4}
Molar mass	210.57 g·mol^{−1}
Melting point	69 °C (156 °F; 342 K)
- Except where otherwise noted, data are given for materials in their standard state (at 25 °C [77 °F], 100 kPa). Infobox references

Trimellitic anhydride chloride is a chemical compound used to produce polyamide-imide plastic.

== See also ==
- Mellitic acid
- Trimellitic anhydride
