= Plastic automotive engine =

Type of gasoline engine

The Plastic automotive engine has its origins in the late 1970s with research and work done by Matthew (Matti) Holtzberg of Polimotor Research and his associates. Since then Holtzberg and others have done steady work in the field.

== Holtzberg's early work ==
Matti Holtzberg first attempted to make polymer pistons for an Austin Mini engine in 1969. The pistons ran for only 20 minutes until failure. Holtzberg remedied this by fitting the pistons with aluminium crowns and he sold these pistons to racing builders during the early 1970s.

== Polimotor research ==
Matti Holtzberg founded Polimotor Research Inc. in 1979. It was based in Fair Lawn, New Jersey. The company, in cooperation with its suppliers and sponsors, created and raced engines consisting of a large percentage of polymers in the 1980s.

=== Version One ===
Version one was based on Ford's 2.3-liter Pinto engine and weighed 152 pounds (69 kg) (vs. 415 pounds (188 kg) for its cast iron counterpart). It was designed to produce 318 horsepower (237 kW) at 9200 rpm. It was composed of metal cylinder sleeves, metal combustion chamber tops, metal piston crowns, bearings, valves and seats, and a stock 2.3L Pinto crankshaft. Nearly everything else in the engine, including the block, rods and piston skirts, were made of glass reinforced Polyamide-imide thermoplastic resins manufactured at the time by Amoco Chemicals Co. The engine was never installed in a vehicle.

Although sources claimed that Ford had been a partner in creating the engine, Holtzberg was later quoted as saying that "Ford was not involved at all".

=== Version Two ===
Another engine, supposedly based upon the Cosworth BDA and YB series engines, weighed 168 pounds (76 kg), half the weight of its metal counterpart. Plastic parts included the engine block, cam cover, air intake trumpets, intake valve stems, piston skirts and wrist pins, connecting rods, oil scraper piston rings, tappets, valve spring retainers and timing gears.

The engine was raced over two seasons. It was raced in a Lola T616 HU04 and competed in the International Motor Sports Association's (IMSA) Camel GT Championship in the Camel Lights (Group C2) category in 1984 and 1985. The car earned several top 5 finishes including its best finish of third in class at the 1985 Lime Rock 2 hours.

== Holtzberg patents ==
Throughout the 1980s, Holtzberg was granted 10 patents for composite engine parts and their methods of production. The patents were issued between 1983 and 1988 and are elaborated on in this section.

The first patent issued was for ignition cables, citing prior art for other non-metallic conductive materials and their ability to reduce RF interference related problems. These cables consisted of a graphite/resin composite conductor strands and a protective silicone sheath. The strands were to be twisted together and drawn through the liquid matrix material, finally being surrounded by the sheath. The two parts would be extruded together to form the cable and ensure a well bound structure of thousands of individual graphite composite filaments.

The majority of patents are for Polyamide-imide engine components, with the potential for graphite, glass or titanium reinforcement as a composite. The inventions are claimed to have a superior stiffness-to-weight ratio, be up to 70% lighter than traditional parts and reduce vibration and forces within the engine. The composite parts are also claimed to reduce production requirements due to being injection moulded with consequently reduced finishing work.

Although the temperature, time and other process variables differ between parts, the general manufacturing process follows. The component is first injection moulded and allowed to cool past its plastic deformation temperature. It is then post cured by solid state polymerisation at a series of temperature steps. This is performed in an inert atmosphere which helps to expel by-products of reactions until the polymer is chemically stable. During this process the heat deflection temperature of the material also increases. The part is now cooled and post-processed. Post processing can take the form of machining, insertion or adhesion of metal parts or a simple cleaning of the part.

== Composite Castings LLC ==
In 1990 Matti Holtzberg founded Composite Castings LLC, based in West Palm Beach, Florida. By 2011 they had developed a V4 carbon reinforced epoxy composite engine block with materials supplied by Toho Tenax. The block is claimed by Holtzberg to be up to 50% lighter than an equivalent aluminium model. The blocks are produced to net shape so minimal finishing work is required to make them ready for use. Holtzberg claims that this reduces tooling and production costs by 50% in comparison to die casting.

== Fraunhofer and Sumitomo research ==
In April 2015 the Fraunhofer group in collaboration with the high performance polymer division of Sumitomo Bakelite Co announced their development of a single cylinder research engine with a casing made of injection moulded glass fibre reinforced phenolic resin (55/45 respective composition). The engine weighs about 20% less than an equivalent of aluminium. Their design uses metal inserts in places of high thermal and mechanical stress, for example in the cylinder liner.

The engine was presented at the 2015 Hannover Messe.

== Solvay revival of Polimotor ==
In May 2015 it was reported that the Belgian chemical company Solvay had shown interest in reviving the concept with assistance from Matti Holtzberg. The engine is planned to weigh less than 148 pounds (67 kg) and generate over 420 horsepower (310 kW), it is also planned to be turbocharged. Several components will be replaced with polymer counterparts, these can be seen in the table below.

Part	Material	Description	Reference
Cam sprockets	PAI	30% carbon fibre	
Oil scavenge lines	PEEK	30% carbon fibre	
Water pump outlet	PPA	30% glass fibre	
Water pump seal	FKM		
Water pump internals	PPS	40% glass fibre	
Fuel rail	PPS	40% glass fibre	
Injector o-rings	FKM		
Intake runner	PEEK	30% carbon fibre, FDM manufactured	
Plenum chamber	PA6	40% glass beads, SLS manufactured	
Oil pump housing	PEEK	30% carbon fibre	
Cam cover	PPS		

The engine was planned to be installed in a Norma M-20 chassis and raced at Lime Rock in 2016 and a possible Le Mans entry in 2017. However this did not materialise.
