= Mellitic anhydride =

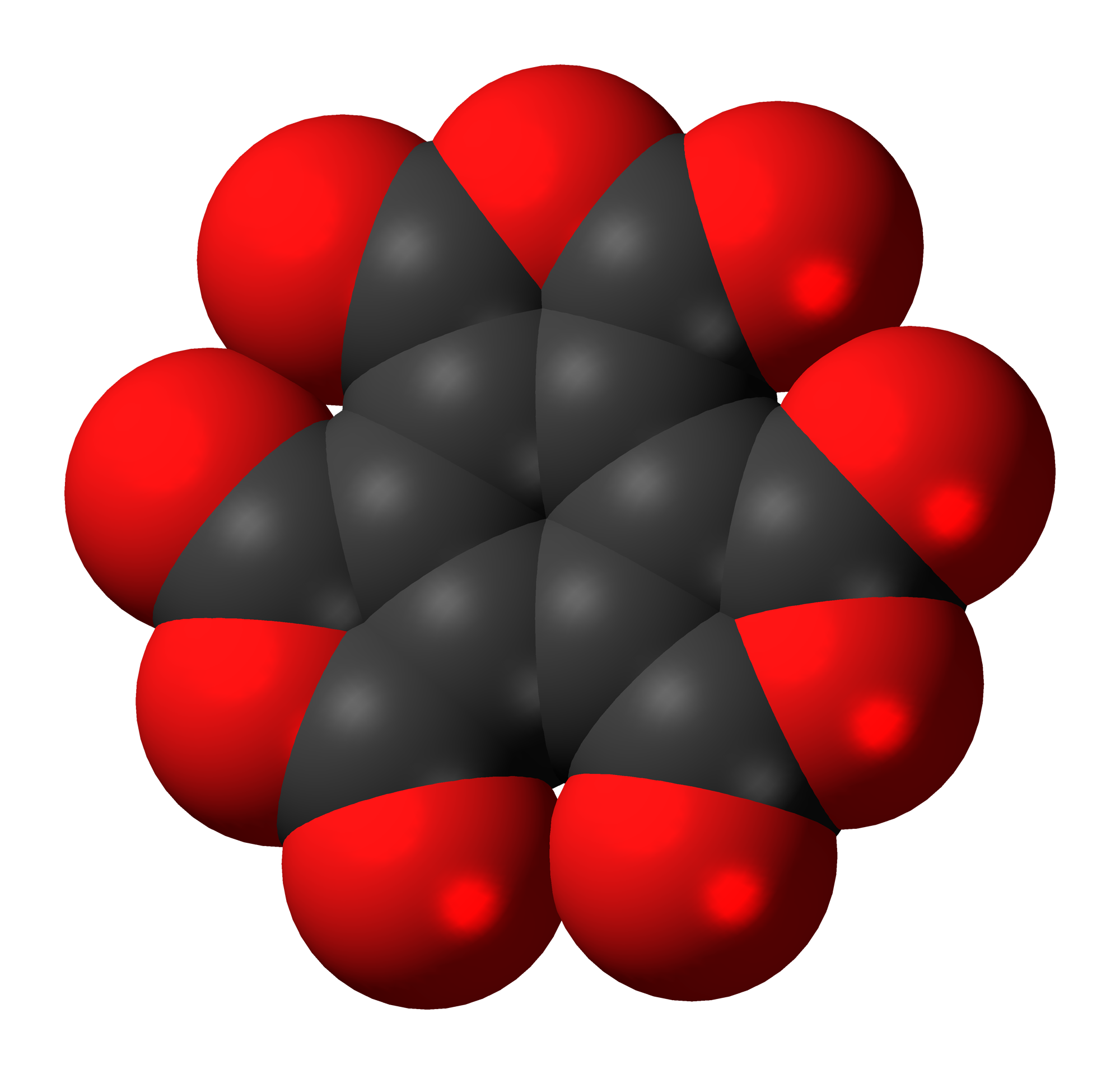

Names
- Preferred IUPAC name Benzo[1,2-c:3,4-c′:5,6-c′′]trifuran-1,3,4,6,7,9-hexone

Identifiers
CAS Number	4253-24-1
3D model (JSmol)	Interactive image
ChemSpider	223826
PubChem CID	255291
UNII	R2K7PH4G2C
CompTox Dashboard (EPA)	DTXSID40292184
- InChI: InChI=1S/C12O9/c13-7-1-2(8(14)19-7)4-6(12(18)21-11(4)17)5-3(1)9(15)20-10(5)16 Key: NNYHMCFMPHPHOQ-UHFFFAOYSA-N; InChI=1/C12O9/c13-7-1-2(8(14)19-7)4-6(12(18)21-11(4)17)5-3(1)9(15)20-10(5)16 Key: NNYHMCFMPHPHOQ-UHFFFAOYAV
- SMILES: O=C2OC(=O)c1c4c(c3c(c12)C(=O)OC3=O)C(=O)OC4=O

Properties
Chemical formula	C_{12}O_{9}
Molar mass	288.123 g·mol^{−1}
Appearance	colorless solid
Melting point	161 °C; 322 °F; 434 K
Vapor pressure	0.000004 mmHg (20°C)

Hazards
- NIOSH (US health exposure limits)
PEL (Permissible)	none
REL (Recommended)	TWA 0.005 ppm (0.04 mg/m3) Should be handled in the workplace as an extremely toxic substance.
IDLH (Immediate danger)	N.D.
- Except where otherwise noted, data are given for materials in their standard state (at 25 °C [77 °F], 100 kPa). verify (what is ?) Infobox references

Mellitic anhydride, the anhydride of mellitic acid, is an organic compound with the formula C_{12}O_{9}.

Containing no other elements (e.g., hydrogen) besides carbon and oxygen, mellitic anhydride is an oxide of carbon (oxocarbon), and, along with CO_{2}, CO, and C_{3}O_{2}, is one of the only four that are reasonably stable under standard conditions. It is a white sublimable solid, apparently obtained by Justus Liebig and Friedrich Wöhler in 1830 in their study of mellite ("honey stone") and has the empirical formula C_{4}O_{3}. The substance was properly characterized in 1913 by H. Meyer and K. Steiner. It retains the aromatic character of the benzene ring.
