= Mellite =

Organic mineral

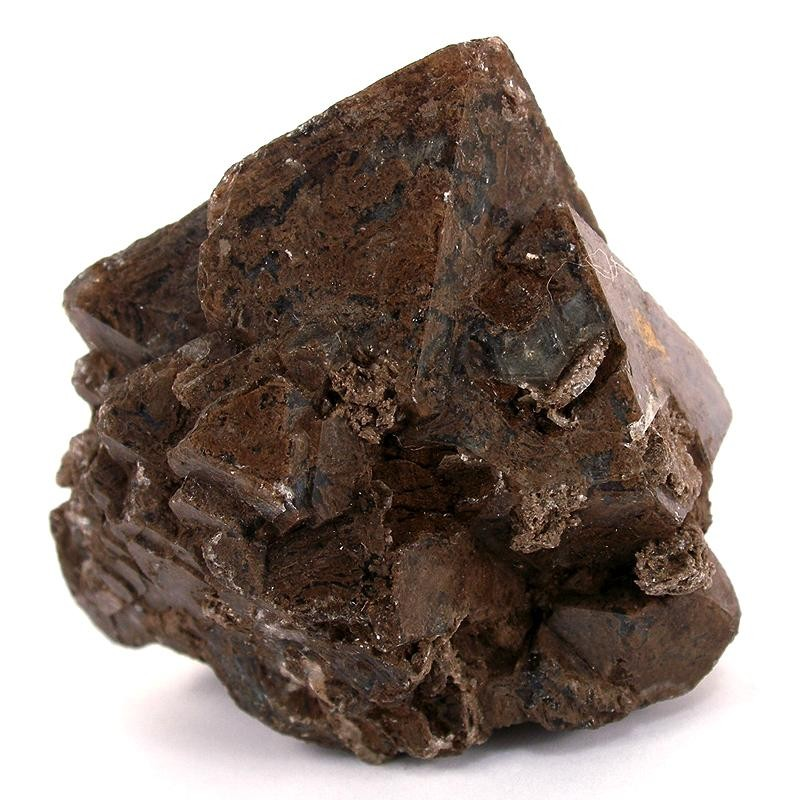

General
- Category: Organic minerals
- Formula: Al_{2}[C_{6}(COO)_{6}]·16H_{2}O
- IMA symbol: Mel
- Strunz classification: 10.AC.05
- Crystal system: Tetragonal
- Crystal class: Ditetragonal dipyramidal (4/mmm); H-M symbol: (4/m 2/m 2/m)
- Space group: I4_{1}/acd
- Unit cell: a = 15.53 Å, c = 23.19 Å; Z = 8

Identification
- Color: Honey-yellow, deep red, pale shades of red, brown, gray, white;
- Crystal habit: Elongated bipyramidal prismatic; as nodules and coatings, fine-grained massive
- Cleavage: poor/indistinct on {023}
- Fracture: conchoidal
- Tenacity: Slightly sectile
- Mohs scale hardness: 2–2 1/2
- Luster: Vitreous, resinous, greasy
- Streak: White
- Diaphaneity: Transparent to translucent
- Specific gravity: 1.64
- Optical properties: Uniaxial (−) may be anomalously biaxial
- Refractive index: n_{ω} = 1.539 n_{ε} = 1.511
- Birefringence: δ = 0.028
- Pleochroism: Weak; O = yellowish brown; E = yellow
- Ultraviolet fluorescence: Pale yellow to blue (LW & SW UV)
- Other characteristics: Pyroelectric

Mellite, also called honeystone, is an unusual mineral being also an organic chemical. It is chemically identified as an aluminium salt of mellitic acid, and specifically as aluminium benzenehexacarboxylate hexadecahydrate, with the chemical formula Al_{2}C_{6}(COO)_{6}·16H_{2}O.

It is a translucent honey-coloured crystal which can be polished and faceted to form striking gemstones. It crystallizes in the tetragonal system and occurs both in good crystals and as formless masses. It is soft with a Mohs hardness of 2 to 2.5 and has a low specific gravity of 1.6.

It was discovered originally in 1789 at Artern in Thuringia, Germany. It has subsequently also been found in Russia, Austria, the Czech Republic, and Hungary. It was named from the Greek μέλι meli "honey", in allusion to its color.

It is found associated with lignite and is assumed to be formed from plant material with aluminium derived from clay.

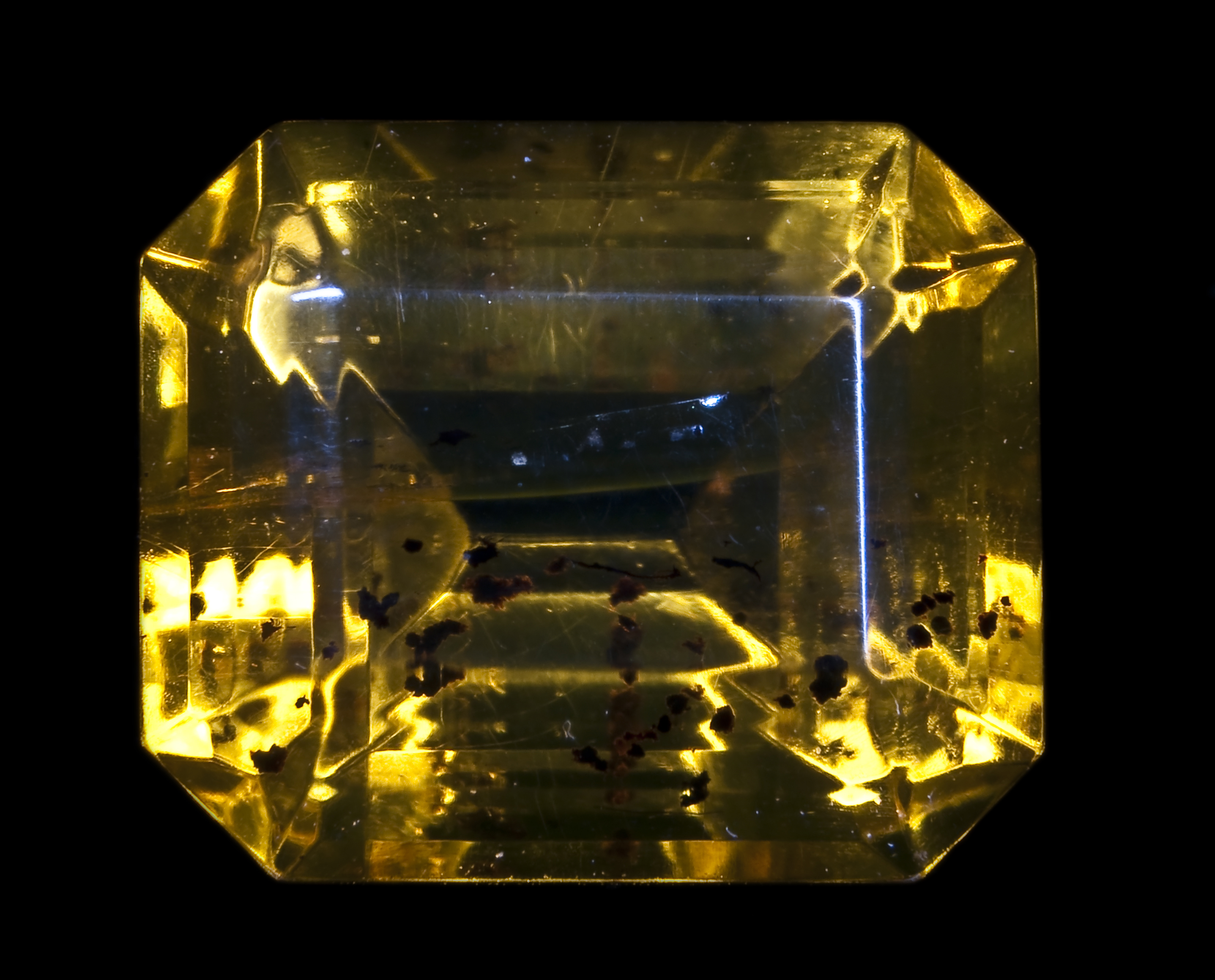
Cut and polished mellite gemstone

== Structure ==
The crystal structure of mellite has been determined by neutron diffraction and consists of slightly distorted Al(H_{2}O)_{6}^{3+} octahedra linked by hydrogen bonds to [C_{6}(COO)_{6}]^{6−} mellitate anions and water of crystallization.

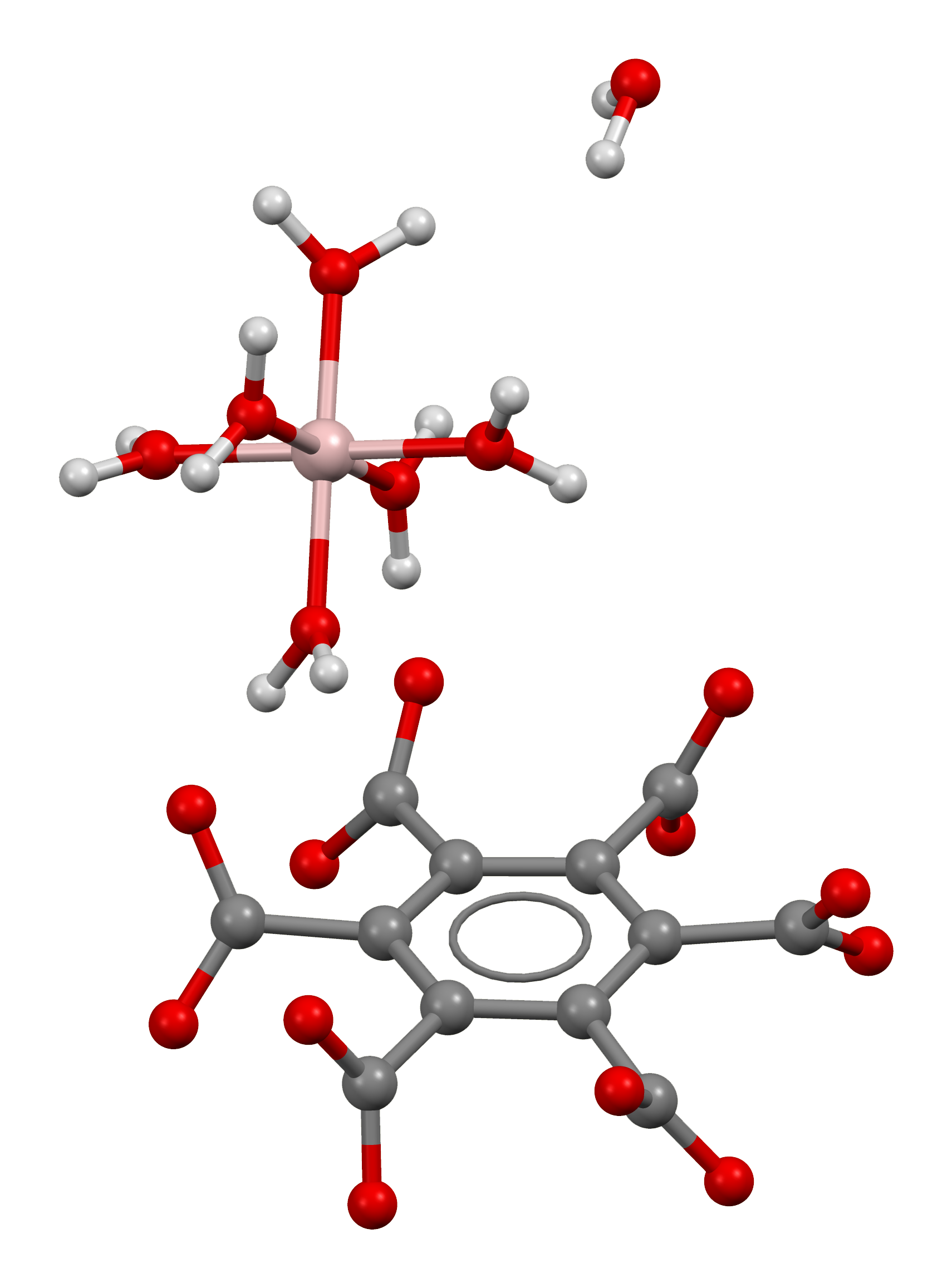
Ball-and-stick model of the asymmetric unit of mellite

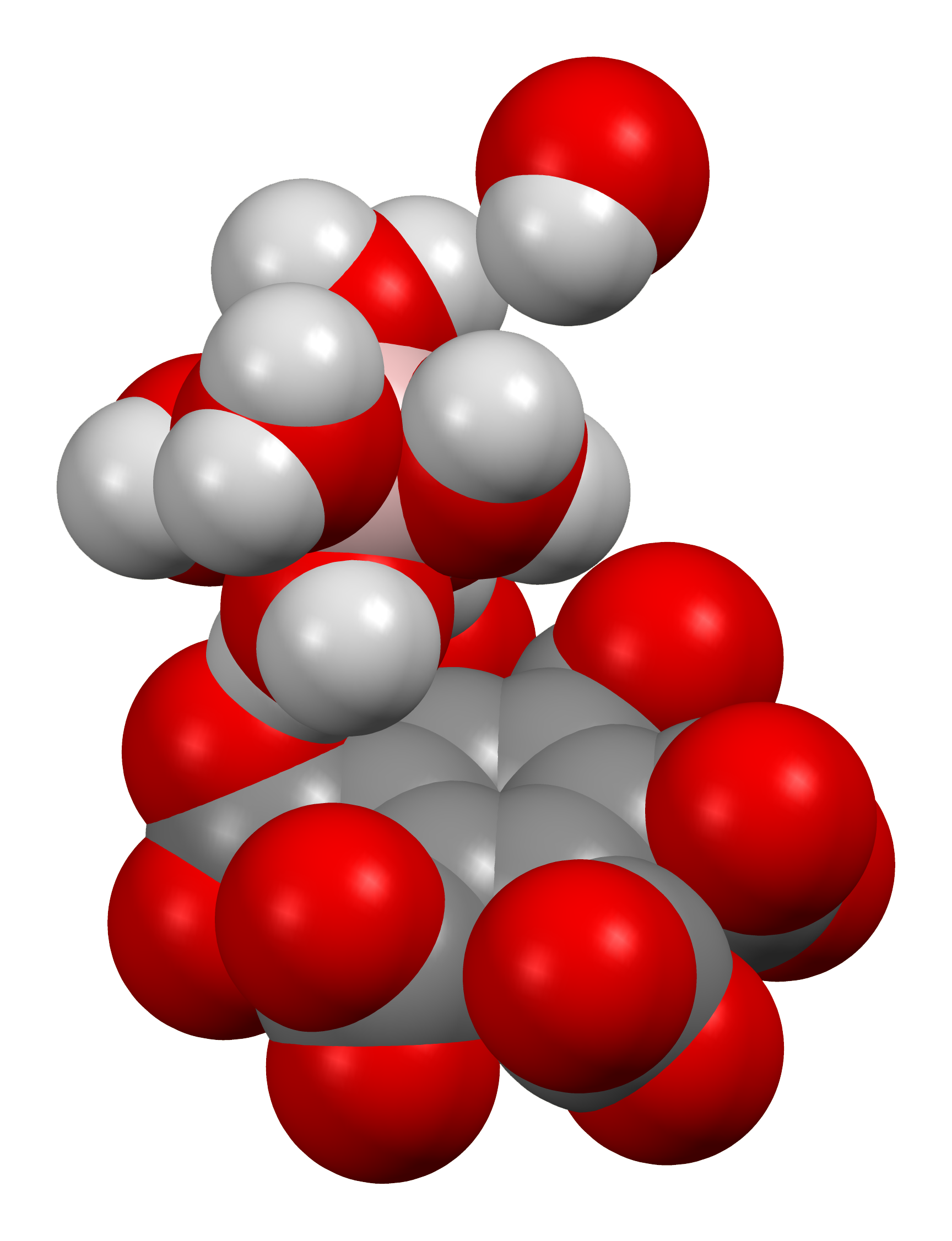
Space-filling model of the asymmetric unit

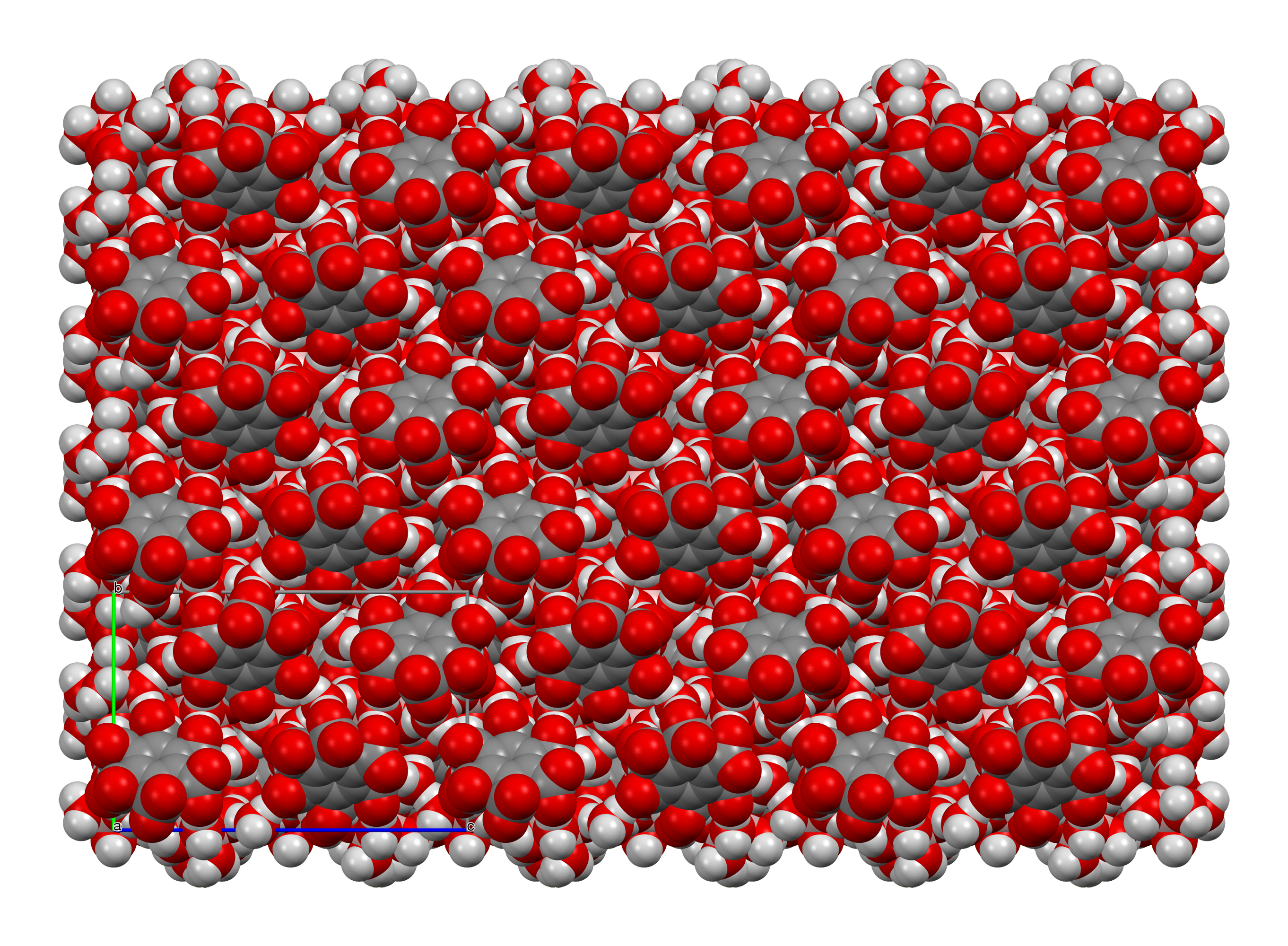
Packing of 3×3×3 unit cells

== See also ==
- Mellitic anhydride
