= Trimellitic anhydride =

Identifiers
CAS Number	552-30-7
3D model (JSmol)	Interactive image
ChEBI	CHEBI:53050
ChEMBL	ChEMBL2137687
ChemSpider	10618
ECHA InfoCard	100.008.190
EC Number	209-008-0
KEGG	C0959
PubChem CID	11089
RTECS number	DC2050000
UNII	80T61EUU7H
CompTox Dashboard (EPA)	DTXSID7026235
- InChI: InChI=1S/C9H4O5/c10-7(11)4-1-2-5-6(3-4)9(13)14-8(5)12/h1-3H,(H,10,11) Key: SRPWOOOHEPICQU-UHFFFAOYSA-N
- SMILES: C1=CC2=C(C=C1C(=O)O)C(=O)OC2=O

Properties
Chemical formula	C_{9}H_{4}O_{5}
Molar mass	192.126 g·mol^{−1}
Appearance	colorless or white solid
Density	1.54 g/cm^{3}
Melting point	168 °C (334 °F; 441 K)
Boiling point	390 °C (734 °F; 663 K)

Hazards
- GHS labelling
Pictograms	(GHS05: Corrosive) (GHS07: Exclamation mark) (GHS08: Health hazard)
Signal word	Danger
Hazard statements	H317, H318, H334, H335
Precautionary statements	P261, P271, P272, P280, P285, P302+P352, P304+P340, P304+P341, P305+P351+P338, P310, P312, P321, P333+P313, P342+P311, P363, P403+P233, P405, P501
- Except where otherwise noted, data are given for materials in their standard state (at 25 °C [77 °F], 100 kPa). Infobox references

Trimellitic anhydride is an organic compound with the formula HO_{2}CC_{6}H_{3}(C_{2}O_{3}). It is the cyclic anhydride of trimellitic acid. The compound is a colorless to white solid. It's primarily used in the production of various polymers, polyesters, agricultural chemicals and dyes. Several thousand tons of this compound are produced annually as a precursor to plasticizers for polyvinyl chloride. It is produced by air-oxidation of 1,2,4-trimethylbenzene.
