= Hemimellitic acid =

Names
- IUPAC name benzene-1,2,3-tricarboxylic acid

Identifiers
CAS Number	569-51-7
3D model (JSmol)	Interactive image
ChEMBL	ChEMBL1161013
ChemSpider	10814
ECHA InfoCard	100.008.471
EC Number	209-317-0
PubChem CID	11288
UNII	CKU8PTZ7M8
CompTox Dashboard (EPA)	DTXSID901018142
- InChI: InChI=1S/C9H6O6/c10-7(11)4-2-1-3-5(8(12)13)6(4)9(14)15/h1-3H,(H,10,11)(H,12,13)(H,14,15) Key: UJMDYLWCYJJYMO-UHFFFAOYSA-N
- SMILES: C1=CC(=C(C(=C1)C(=O)O)C(=O)O)C(=O)O

Properties
Chemical formula	C_{9}H_{6}O_{6}
Molar mass	210.141 g·mol^{−1}
Appearance	white solid
Melting point	190–192 °C (374–378 °F; 463–465 K)

Hazards
- GHS labelling
Pictograms	(GHS07: Exclamation mark)
Signal word	Warning
Hazard statements	H315, H319, H335
Precautionary statements	P261, P264, P271, P280, P302+P352, P304+P340, P305+P351+P338, P312, P321, P332+P313, P337+P313, P362, P403+P233, P405, P501
- Except where otherwise noted, data are given for materials in their standard state (at 25 °C [77 °F], 100 kPa). Infobox references

Hemimellitic acid (benzene-1,2,3-tricarboxylic acid) is an organic compound with the molecular formula C_{6}H_{3}(СО_{2}Н)_{3}. Like the other isomers of benzenetricarboxylic acid, hemimellitic acid is a colorless solid. It is prepared by oxidation of 1,2,3-trimethylbenzene.

== Isomers ==
- Trimellitic acid (benzene-1,2,4-tricarboxylic acid)
- Trimesic acid (benzene-1,3,5-tricarboxylic acid)
