= Behavior Tech Computer =

Manufacturing company of Taiwan

Behavior Tech Computer Corporation
- Native name: 英群企業股份有限公司
- Company type: Public (TWSE: 2341117)
- Founded: 1982; 44 years ago
- Founder: Ke-Kang Su "Steel"
- Headquarters: Xizhi, New Taipei, Taiwan
- Products: Computer keyboards, computer mice, optical disc drives
- Number of employees: 710 (2004)
- Website: www.btc.com.tw

Behavior Tech Computer Corporation (BTC; Chinese: 英群企業股份有限公司) is a Taiwanese manufacturing company based in New Taipei. From its foundation in 1982 to the mid-2010s, it manufactured a wide variety of computer peripherals, including keyboards, webcams and mice. It was once Taiwan's largest manufacturer of computer keyboards and one of the three largest keyboard manufacturers globally. In the mid-2010s, the company pivoted to producing LEDs for industrial use.

== History ==
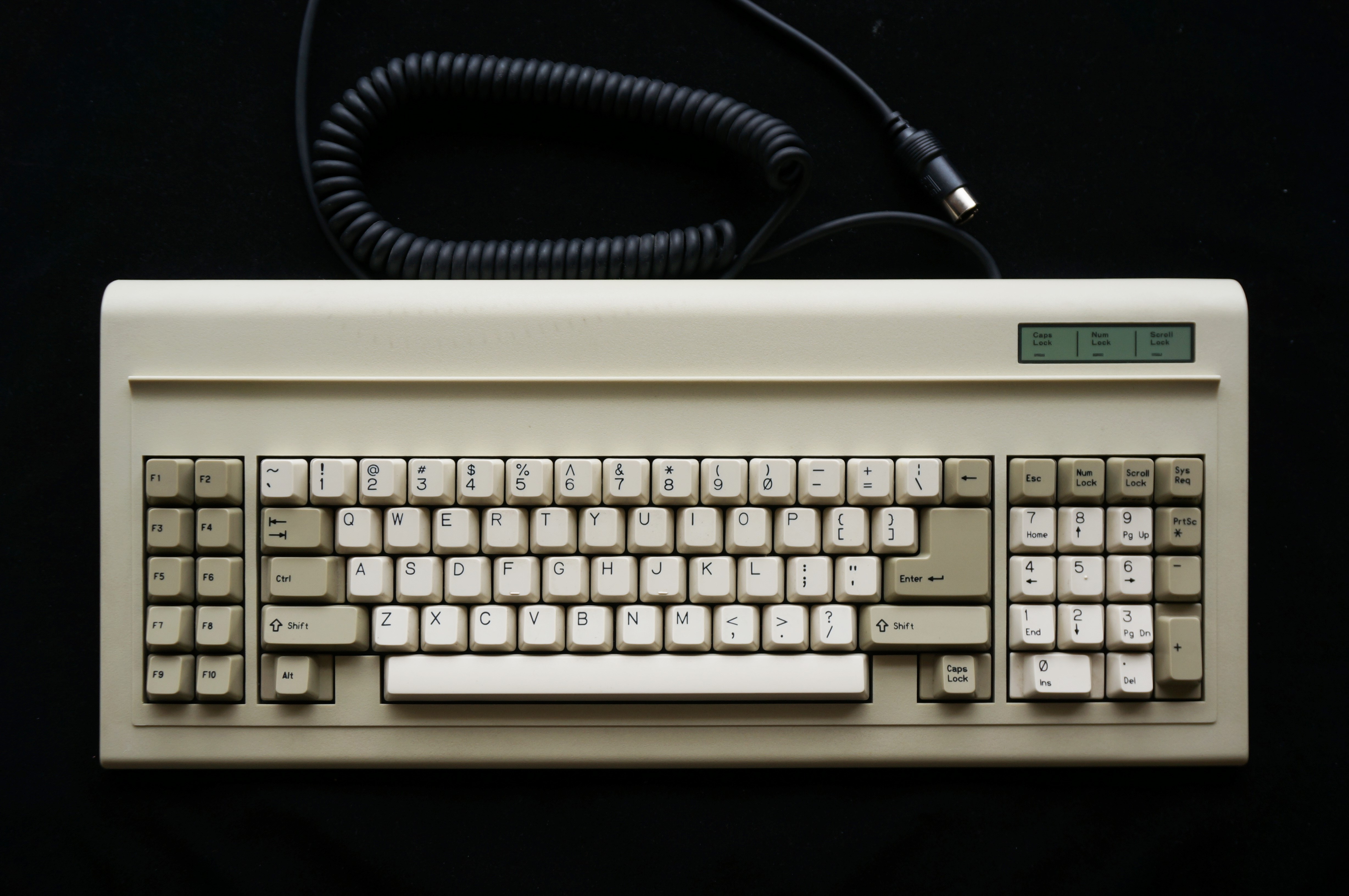
BTC 5060, IBM Model F clone keyboard from 1986

Behavior Tech Computer was established in 1982 in Xizhi, New Taipei, by Ke-Kang Su "Steel". It was founded primarily to manufacture keyboards for clones of the IBM PC, as well as power supply units and computer cases. Its first keyboards used a capacitive design, with each switch containing a foam and foil pad. BTC was unique among Taiwanese keyboard manufacturers at the time in that it produced its own switches instead of relying on outside vendors. It grew steadily in its first few years, achieving US$5 million in sales and a monthly output of roughly 25,000 keyboards by 1986. That year, it established its American subsidiary in Fremont, California. Also in 1986, BTC began producing mechanical keyboards in Taiwan, with a switch design licensed from a Japanese firm. By 1993, the company had become the largest manufacturer of computer keyboards in Taiwan and the third-largest computer keyboard manufacturer globally. By 1994, BTC had established branch offices in London, Germany, France, and the Netherlands; sales in European territories comprised 25 percent of BTC's revenue in 1993. The company went public on the Taiwan Stock Exchange in 1995.

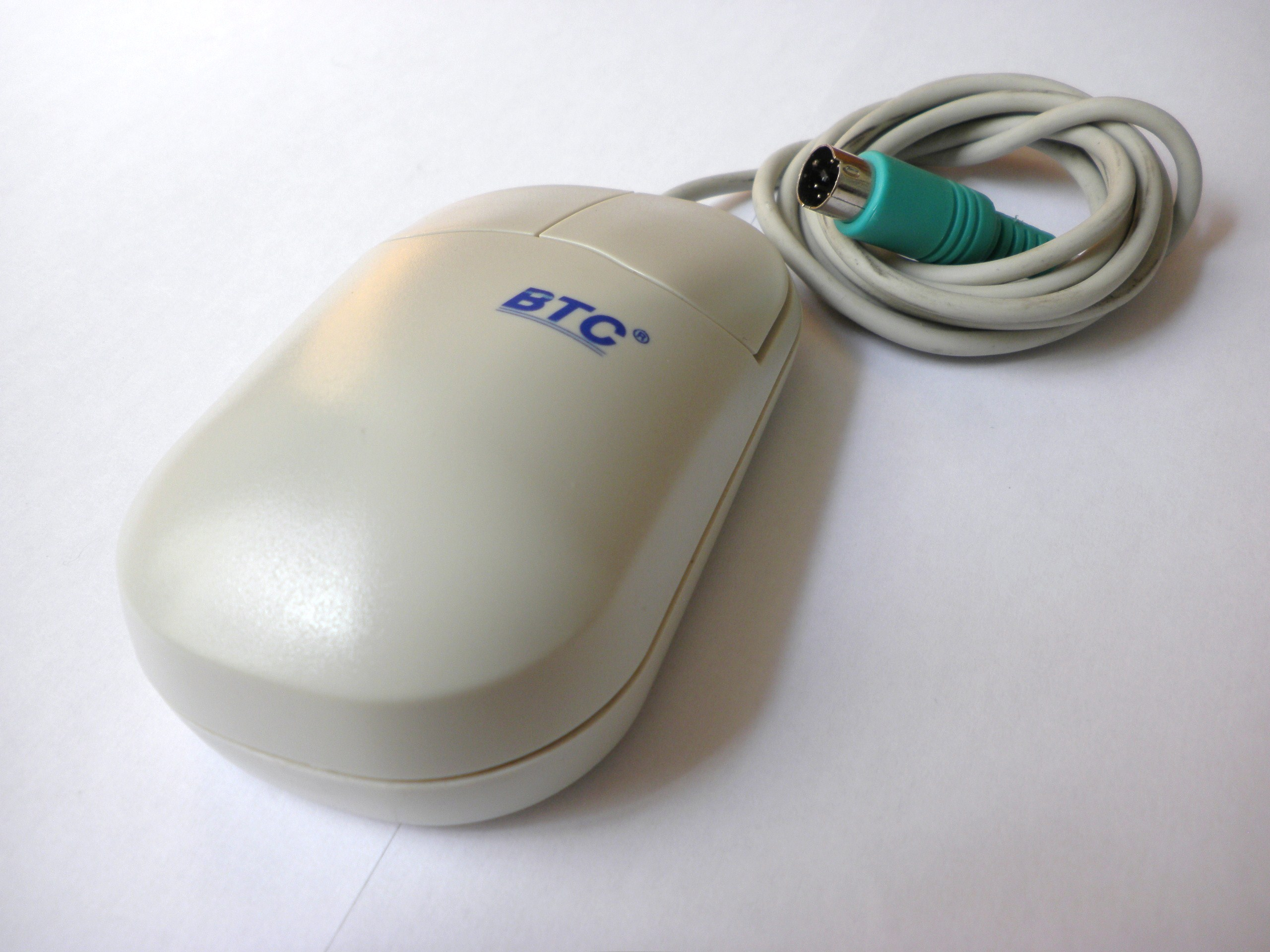
BTC-branded mouse from the 1990s

At the start of the next decade, BTC expanded its scope to include the development, manufacturing, sale, and servicing of other computer hardware such as mice, sound cards, graphics cards, scanners, and even complete computer systems. In November 1993, it formed a joint venture with Oak Technology to allow BTC to manufacture graphics cards using Oak's graphics accelerator chips. In 1995, BTC diversified its consumer products further with the production of optical disc drives (initially CD-ROM drives, later video CD players) and ergonomic keyboards. During this time, it raised several plants for its optical drives in Taiwan, as well as a multilingual keyboard plant in France. By the time it introduced its CD-ROM drives to market in spring 1995, BTC was producing 30,000 drives monthly. In 1997, BTC joined an alliance formed by several other computer hardware manufacturers, helmed by Rockwell Semiconductor, to promote the K56Flex standard for modem transmission.

As the profit margins for keyboards began to shrink in the 1990s, BTC shifted focus toward optoelectronics and multimedia products, such as internal and external optical drives, webcams, and GPS receivers. While still among the top three largest keyboard manufacturers globally, by the early 2000s optoelectronic products accounted for 42 percent of the company's sales revenues in 2003, compared to 17 percent for its traditional input devices. International exports, meanwhile, accounted for roughly 90 percent of BTC's total sales. The company operated through a dual business model, balancing original equipment manufacturer (OEM) and original design manufacturer (ODM) contracts alongside the distribution of its own branded products across Asia, North America, and Europe. BTC maintained paid-in capital of US$151 million by 2003 and generated revenue of US$445 million that year, a 36 percent increase over fiscal year 2002.

By 2004, BTC employed over 710 workers globally. Its research and development division that year comprised 130 hardware engineers and 20 software developers, complemented by a quality assurance department of 20 workers. The remaining workforce consisted of manufacturing and infrastructure, including a high-capacity keyboard factory raised in the early 2000s capable of outputting between 1.5 million and 2.5 million keyboards per month. Its operational infrastructure included offices in Beijing, Dongguan, France, the Netherlands, South Korea, and the United States. Manufacturing operations were similarly spread across facilities in the France, South Korea, Taiwan, Hungary, the Czech Republic, and Dongguan, which were further supported by distribution hubs and warehouses located in England, Mexico, Malaysia, Texas, Scotland, and Singapore. Domestic production within Taiwan was anchored by two factories spanning 13,200 square meters in Zhongli District, primarily dedicated to pilot runs and optical disc drive upgrades.

In 2005, BTC began shifting production of its optical disc drives from in-house to its competitor Foxconn, also of Taiwan, using the latter as a contract manufacturer. In 2006, BTC shut down the laser assembly production lines of its optical disc drive manufacturing, citing intense competition in the industry, while still producing the loading mechanism assemblies for these drives. It also discontinued selling its own branded drives internationally that year, while continuing to sell BTC-branded drives in China and Taiwan. In 2008, it left the optical disc drive business entirely, citing conflicts with patents and the Great Recession's effects on Taiwan. In the mid-2010s, the company pivoted to the production of LEDs for industrial applications.

== See also ==
- List of companies of Taiwan
