= Benzenetricarboxylic acid =

Benzenetricarboxylic acid is a group of chemical compounds which are tricarboxylic derivatives of benzene. Benzenetricarboxylic acid comes in three isomers:

Common Name	Hemimellitic acid	Trimellitic acid	Trimesic acid
Systematic Name	1,2,3-benzenetricarboxylic acid	1,2,4-benzenetricarboxylic acid	1,3,5-benzenetricarboxylic acid
Structural Formula			
CAS Registry Number	732304-21-1	528-44-9	554-95-0

All isomers share the molecular weight 210.14 g/mol and the chemical formula C_{9}H_{6}O_{6}.
