= BTCS Inc. =

American blockchain infrastructure technology company

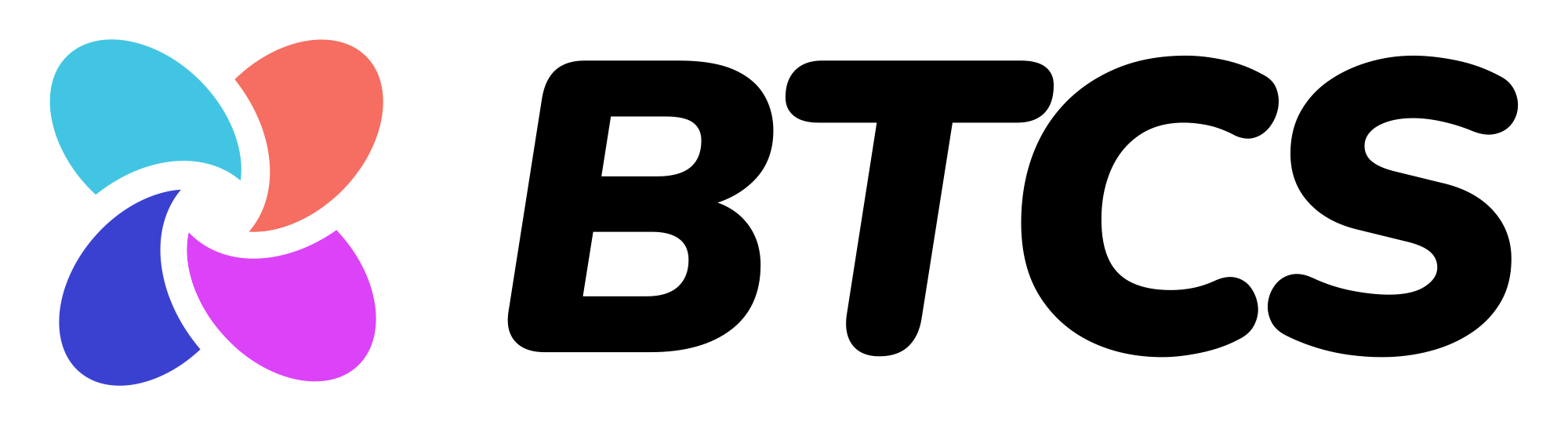
- Type: Public company
- Traded as: Nasdaq: BTCS
- Industry: Blockchain infrastructure
- Founded: June 2013; 13 years ago
- Founders: Michal Handerhan; Timothy Sidie
- Headquarters: Silver Spring, Maryland
- Key people: Charles W. Allen (CEO); Michal Handerhan (COO)
- Services: Ethereum validator node operations, staking services
- Revenue: ▲US$4.1 million (2024)
- Number of employees: 30 (2024)
- Website: www.btcs.com

BTCS Inc. is an American blockchain infrastructure technology company that operates Ethereum validator nodes and provides staking services. The company trades on the Nasdaq under the ticker symbol "BTCS" and is headquartered in Silver Spring, Maryland.

The company was originally incorporated in 2013 and began as a Bitcoin mining operation and e-commerce marketplace accepting cryptocurrency payments. In 2021, BTCS pivoted toward Ethereum infrastructure and validator services.

== History ==
The company was founded in 2013 by Michal Handerhan and Timothy Sidie, with Charles W. Allen joining shortly thereafter. BTCS listed on the Nasdaq Capital Market in February 2014 under the ticker symbol "BTCS".

== Operations ==
BTCS operates blockchain infrastructure through its Builder+ platform, which provides Ethereum block building services, and its NodeOps platform, which manages validator nodes and generates staking revenue.

In 2025, BTCS announced a financing initiative that integrates traditional capital markets with decentralized finance, described as a "DeFi/TradFi flywheel" strategy. The program is intended to raise up to $225 million for strategic Ethereum acquisitions, combining equity offerings, debt instruments, and on-chain DeFi yield mechanisms. As of July 2025, BTCS reported holdings of 70,028 ETH valued at approximately $270 million.

== Shareholder programs ==
In January 2022, BTCS announced the "Bividend," the first-ever dividend payable in Bitcoin by a Nasdaq-listed company. Shareholders of record were able to elect to receive the dividend in Bitcoin or cash.

On August 18, 2025, BTCS launched the first Ethereum-based dividend. The program offered a one-time distribution of $0.05 per share in ETH or cash, depending on shareholder preference.

The initiative also included a loyalty bonus of $0.35 per share in ETH for shareholders who transferred their shares into book-entry form and held them from September 26, 2025 through January 26, 2026. Combined, eligible investors could earn up to $0.40 per share in ETH. The loyalty structure was designed to reward long-term holders and discourage short selling.

== Financials ==
The company's market capitalization was approximately US$220.12 million as of August 2025. For fiscal year 2024, BTCS reported revenues of $4.1 million, a 204% increase over the previous year.
