= Trimesic acid =

- Skeletal formula

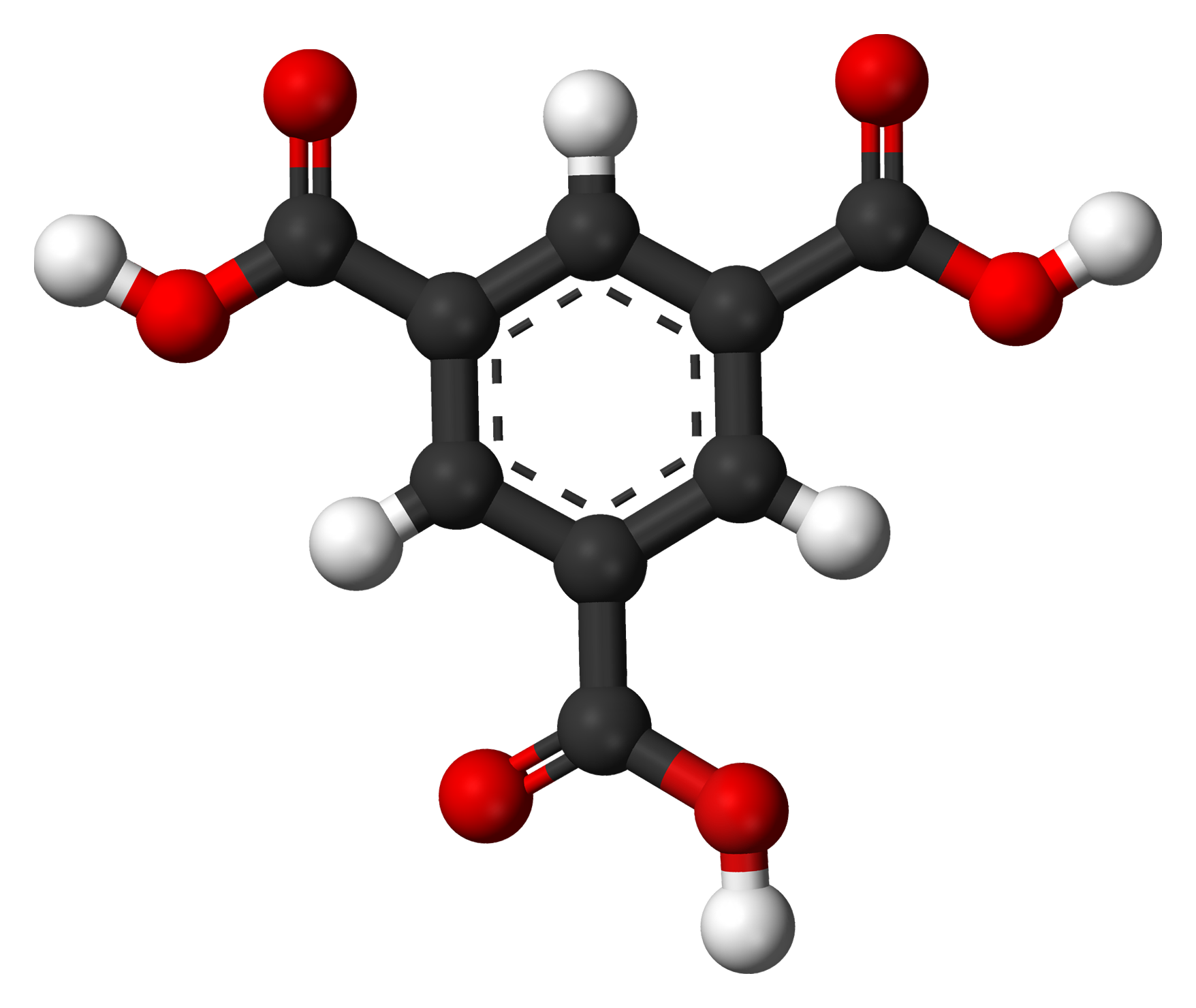
- Ball-and-stick model

Names
- Preferred IUPAC name Benzene-1,3,5-tricarboxylic acid

Identifiers
CAS Number	554-95-0
3D model (JSmol)	Interactive image
Abbreviations	TMA
Beilstein Reference	2053080
ChEBI	CHEBI:46032
ChEMBL	ChEMBL77562
ChemSpider	10665
DrugBank	DB08632
ECHA InfoCard	100.008.253
EC Number	209-077-7
Gmelin Reference	51147
PubChem CID	11138
UNII	OU36OO5MTN
CompTox Dashboard (EPA)	DTXSID8021488
- InChI: InChI=1S/C9H6O6/c10-7(11)4-1-5(8(12)13)3-6(2-4)9(14)15/h1-3H,(H,10,11)(H,12,13)(H,14,15) Key: QMKYBPDZANOJGF-UHFFFAOYSA-N; InChI=1/C9H6O6/c10-7(11)4-1-5(8(12)13)3-6(2-4)9(14)15/h1-3H,(H,10,11)(H,12,13)(H,14,15) Key: QMKYBPDZANOJGF-UHFFFAOYAC
- SMILES: c1c(cc(cc1C(=O)O)C(=O)O)C(=O)O

Properties
Chemical formula	C_{9}H_{6}O_{6}
Molar mass	210.141 g·mol^{−1}
Acidity (pK_{a})	3.12, 3.89, 4.70

Hazards
- GHS labelling
Pictograms	(GHS07: Exclamation mark)
Signal word	Warning
Hazard statements	H315, H319, H335
Precautionary statements	P261, P264, P271, P280, P302+P352, P304+P340, P305+P351+P338, P312, P321, P332+P313, P337+P313, P362, P403+P233, P405, P501
Safety data sheet (SDS)	Oxford MSDS
- Except where otherwise noted, data are given for materials in their standard state (at 25 °C [77 °F], 100 kPa). verify (what is ?) Infobox references

Trimesic acid, also known as benzene-1,3,5-tricarboxylic acid, is an organic compound with the formula C_{6}H_{3}(CO_{2}H)_{3}. It is one of three isomers of benzenetricarboxylic acid. A colorless solid, trimesic acid has some commercial value as a precursor to some plasticizers.

Trimesic acid can be combined with para-hydroxypyridine to make a water-based gel, stable up to 95 °C.

Trimesic acid crystallizes from water to form a hydrogen-bonded hydrated network with wide unidimensional empty channels.

== See also ==
- Trimellitic acid (1,2,4-benzenetricarboxylic acid)
- Hemimellitic acid (1,2,3-benzenetricarboxylic acid)
