= Organic compound =

Carbon-containing chemical compound

Methane (CH_{4}) is among the simplest organic compounds.

Organic compounds are a subclass of chemical compounds of carbon. Little consensus exists among chemists on the exact definition of organic compound; the only universally accepted definition is the quasi-tautological "organic compounds are the subject matter of organic chemistry".

Generally, any large chemical compound containing a carbon–hydrogen or carbon–carbon bond is accepted as an organic compound. Thus alkanes (e.g. ethane, CH_{3}−CH_{3}) and their derivatives are typically considered organic. For historical and disciplinary reasons, small molecules containing carbon are generally not accepted: cyanide ion (CN^{−}), hydrogen cyanide (HCN), chloroformic acid (ClCO_{2}H), carbon dioxide (CO_{2}), and carbonate ion (CO^{2−}_{3}) may all be excluded. Because of carbon's ability to catenate (form chains with other carbon atoms), millions of organic compounds are known.

Although organic compounds make up only a small percentage of Earth's crust, they are of central importance because all known life is based on organic compounds. Living things incorporate inorganic carbon compounds into organic compounds through a network of processes (the carbon cycle) that convert carbon dioxide and a hydrogen source like water into simple sugars and other organic molecules.

In the chemical industry, synthetic organic compounds are ultimately derived from petrochemicals, mainly hydrocarbons. Petrochemicals are themselves formed from the geologic degradation of biological matter at high pressures and temperatures underground.

Historically, organic compounds were defined as compounds originating in living things, an expression of early-modern scientific vitalism. As vitalism became increasingly untenable, organic chemistry broadened its scope to study all large molecules; at the time, all known large molecules contained carbon. Organic molecules discovered in biological contexts are now known as natural products. In the 20th century, chemists discovered new large molecular species amongst the metal complexes. Such objects are not admitted into general organic chemistry unless they also contain carbon; otherwise their study is a new and separate field, metalorganic chemistry.

In chemical nomenclature, an organyl group, frequently represented by the letter R, refers to any monovalent substituent whose open valence is on a carbon atom.

== Definition ==
For historical reasons discussed below, a few types of carbon-containing compounds, such as carbides, carbonates (excluding carbonate esters), simple oxides of carbon (for example, CO and CO_{2}) and cyanides are generally considered inorganic compounds. Different forms (allotropes) of pure carbon, such as diamond, graphite, fullerenes and carbon nanotubes are also excluded because they are simple substances composed of a single element and so not generally considered chemical compounds. The word "organic" in this context does not mean "natural".

== History ==
=== Vitalism ===
Vitalism was a widespread conception that substances found in organic nature are formed from the chemical elements by the action of a "vital force" or "life-force" (vis vitalis) that only living organisms possess.

In the 1810s, Jöns Jacob Berzelius argued that a regulative force must exist within living bodies. Berzelius also contended that compounds could be distinguished by whether they required any organisms in their synthesis (organic compounds) or whether they did not (inorganic compounds). Vitalism taught that formation of these "organic" compounds were fundamentally different from the "inorganic" compounds that could be obtained from the elements by chemical manipulations in laboratories.

Vitalism survived for a short period after the formulation of modern ideas about the atomic theory and chemical elements. It first came under question in 1824, when Friedrich Wöhler synthesized oxalic acid, a compound known to occur only in living organisms, from cyanogen. A further experiment was Wöhler's 1828 synthesis of urea from the inorganic salts potassium cyanate and ammonium sulfate. Urea had long been considered an "organic" compound, as it was known to occur only in the urine of living organisms. Wöhler's experiments were followed by many others, in which increasingly complex "organic" substances were produced from "inorganic" ones without the involvement of any living organism, thus disproving vitalism.

=== Modern classification and ambiguities ===
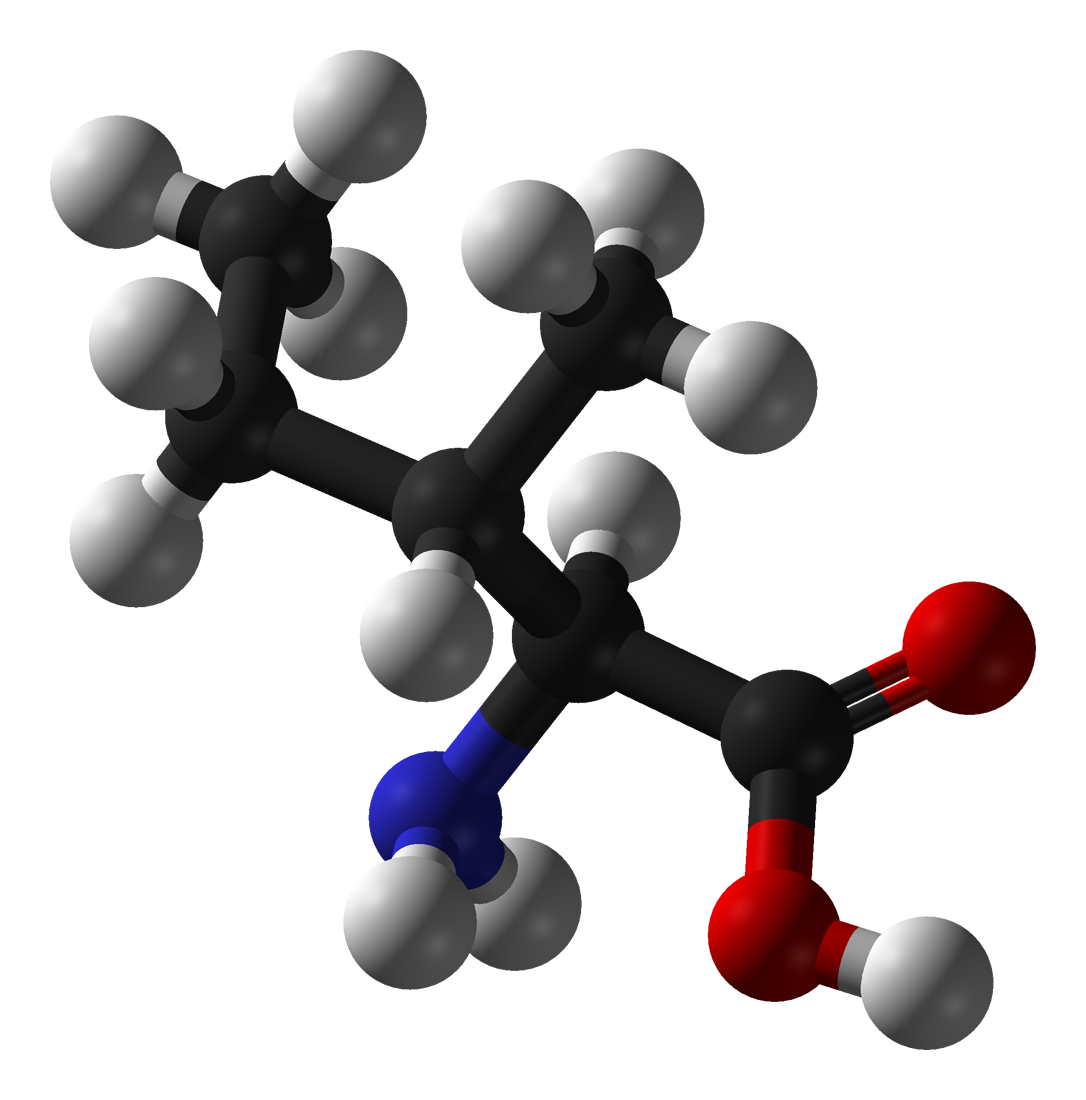
The L-isoleucine molecule, C_{6}H_{13}NO_{2}, showing features typical of organic compounds. Carbon atoms are in black, hydrogens gray, oxygens red, and nitrogen blue.

Although vitalism has been discredited, scientific nomenclature retains the distinction between organic and inorganic compounds. The modern meaning of organic compound is any compound that contains a significant amount of carbon—even though many of the organic compounds known today have no connection to any substance found in living organisms. The term carbogenic has been proposed by E. J. Corey as a modern alternative to organic, but this neologism remains relatively obscure.

As described in detail below, any definition of organic compound that uses simple, broadly-applicable criteria turns out to be unsatisfactory, to varying degrees. The modern, commonly accepted definition of organic compound essentially amounts to any carbon-containing compound, excluding several classes of substances traditionally considered "inorganic". The list of substances so excluded varies from author to author. Still, it is generally agreed upon that there are (at least) a few carbon-containing compounds that should not be considered organic. For instance, almost all authorities would require the exclusion of alloys that contain carbon, including steel (which contains cementite, Fe_{3}C), as well as other metal and semimetal carbides (including "ionic" carbides, e.g., Al_{4}C_{3} and CaC_{2} and "covalent" carbides, e.g. B_{4}C and SiC, and graphite intercalation compounds, e.g. KC_{8}). Other compounds and materials that are considered 'inorganic' by most authorities include: metal carbonates, simple oxides of carbon (CO, CO_{2}, and arguably, C_{3}O_{2}), the allotropes of carbon, cyanide derivatives not containing an organic residue (e.g., KCN, (CN)_{2}, BrCN, cyanate anion OCN^{−}, etc.), and heavier analogs thereof (e.g., cyaphide anion CP^{−}, CSe_{2}, COS; although carbon disulfide CS_{2} is often classed as an organic solvent). Halides of carbon without hydrogen (e.g., CF_{4} and CClF_{3}), phosgene (COCl_{2}), carboranes, metal carbonyls (e.g., nickel tetracarbonyl), mellitic anhydride (C_{12}O_{9}), and other exotic oxocarbons are also considered inorganic by some authorities.

Nickel tetracarbonyl (Ni(CO)_{4}) and other metal carbonyls are often volatile liquids, like many organic compounds, yet they contain only carbon bonded to a transition metal and to oxygen, and are often prepared directly from metal and carbon monoxide. Nickel tetracarbonyl is typically classified as an organometallic compound as it satisfies the broad definition that organometallic chemistry covers all compounds that contain at least one carbon to metal covalent bond; it is unknown whether organometallic compounds form a subset of organic compounds. For example, the evidence of covalent Fe-C bonding in cementite, a major component of steel, places it within this broad definition of organometallic, yet steel and other carbon-containing alloys are seldom regarded as organic compounds. Thus, it is unclear whether the definition of organometallic should be narrowed, whether these considerations imply that organometallic compounds are not necessarily organic, or both.

Metal complexes with organic ligands but no carbon-metal bonds (e.g., (CH_{3}CO_{2})_{2}Cu) are not considered organometallic; instead, they are called metal-organic compounds (and might be considered organic).

The relatively narrow definition of organic compounds as those containing C–H bonds excludes compounds that are (historically and practically) considered organic. Neither urea CO(NH_{2})_{2} nor oxalic acid (COOH)_{2} are organic by this definition, yet they were two key compounds in the vitalism debate. However, the IUPAC Blue Book on organic nomenclature specifically mentions urea and oxalic acid as organic compounds. Other compounds lacking C–H bonds but traditionally considered organic include benzenehexol, mesoxalic acid, and carbon tetrachloride. Mellitic acid, which contains no C–H bonds, is considered a possible organic compound in Martian soil. Terrestrially, it, and its anhydride, mellitic anhydride, are associated with the mineral mellite (Al_{2}C_{6}(COO)_{6}·16H_{2}O).

A slightly broader definition of the organic compound includes all compounds bearing C–H or C–C bonds. This would still exclude urea. Moreover, this definition still leads to somewhat arbitrary divisions in sets of carbon-halogen compounds. For example, CF_{4} and CCl_{4} would be considered by this rule to be "inorganic", whereas CHF_{3}, CHCl_{3}, and C_{2}Cl_{6} would be organic, though these compounds share many physical and chemical properties.

== Classification ==
Organic compounds may be classified in a variety of ways. One major distinction is between natural and synthetic compounds. Organic compounds can also be classified or subdivided by the presence of heteroatoms, e.g., organometallic compounds, which feature bonds between carbon and a metal, and organophosphorus compounds, which feature bonds between carbon and a phosphorus.

Another distinction, based on the size of organic compounds, distinguishes between small molecules and polymers.

=== Natural compounds ===
Natural compounds refer to those that are produced by plants or animals. Many of these are still extracted from natural sources because they would be more expensive to produce artificially. Examples include most sugars, some alkaloids and terpenoids, certain nutrients such as vitamin B_{12}, and, in general, those natural products with large or stereoisometrically complicated molecules present in reasonable concentrations in living organisms.

Further compounds of prime importance in biochemistry are antigens, carbohydrates, enzymes, hormones, lipids and fatty acids, neurotransmitters, nucleic acids, proteins, peptides and amino acids, lectins, vitamins, and fats and oils.

=== Synthetic compounds ===
Compounds that are prepared by reaction of other compounds are known as "synthetic". They may be either compounds that are already found in plants/animals or those artificial compounds that do not occur naturally.

Most polymers (a category that includes all plastics and rubbers) are organic synthetic or semi-synthetic compounds.

=== Biotechnology ===
Many organic compounds—two examples are ethanol and insulin—are manufactured industrially using organisms such as bacteria and yeast. Typically, the DNA of an organism is altered to express compounds not ordinarily produced by the organism. Many such biotechnology-engineered compounds did not previously exist in nature.

== Databases ==
- The CAS database is the most comprehensive repository for data on organic compounds. The search tool SciFinder is offered.
- The Beilstein database contains information on 9.8 million substances, covers the scientific literature from 1771 to the present, and is today accessible via Reaxys. Structures and a large diversity of physical and chemical properties are available for each substance, with reference to original literature.
- PubChem contains 18.4 million entries on compounds and especially covers the field of medicinal chemistry.

A great number of more specialized databases exist for diverse branches of organic chemistry.

== Structure determination ==
The main tools are proton and carbon-13 NMR spectroscopy, IR spectroscopy, mass spectrometry, UV-Vis spectroscopy and X-ray crystallography.

== See also ==
- List of chemical compounds
- List of organic compounds
- Organometallic chemistry – Study of organic compounds containing metal(s)
- Inorganic compound – Chemical compound without any carbon-hydrogen bonds
