= Mellitic acid =

- Skeletal formula

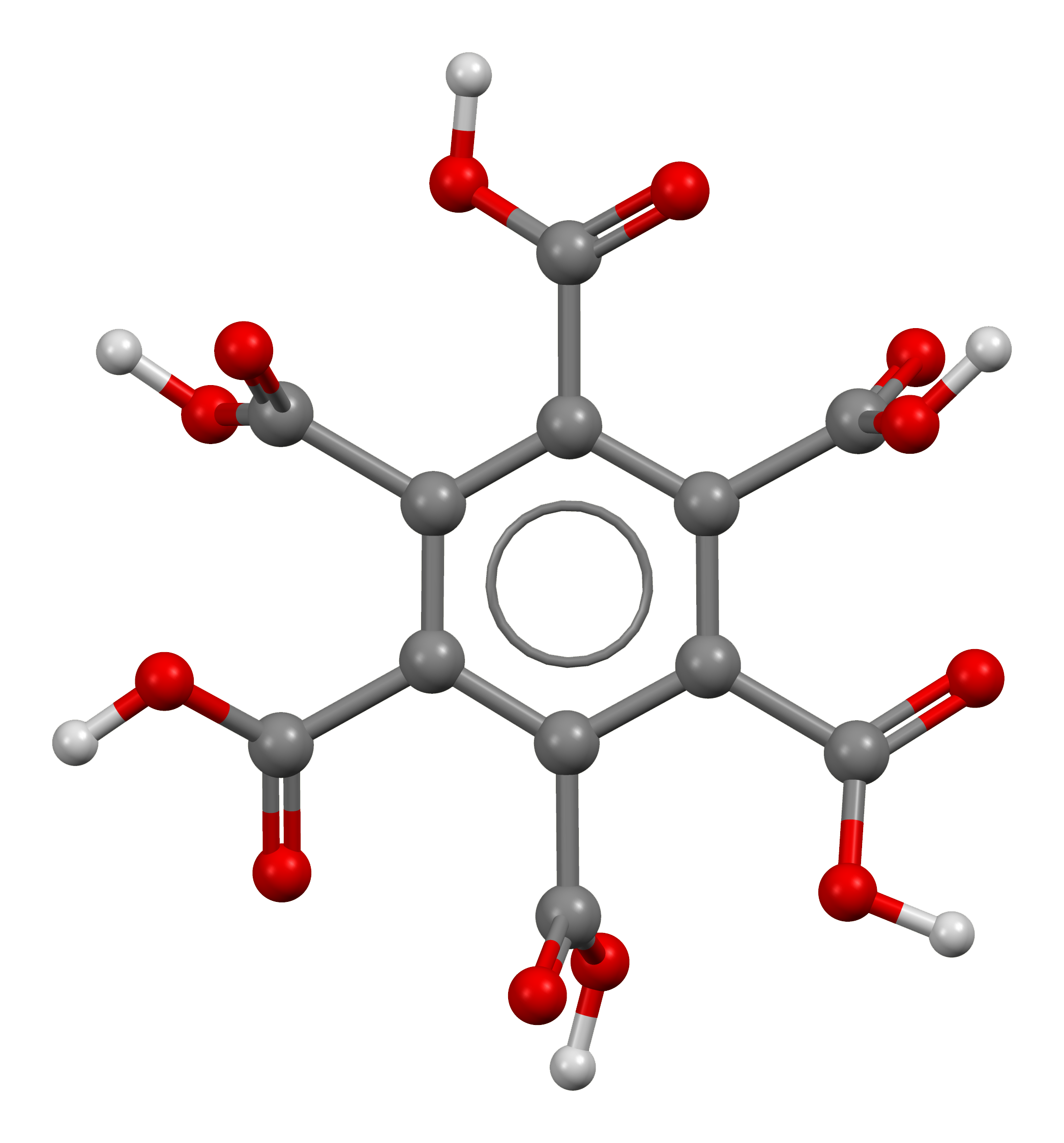
Ball-and-stick model
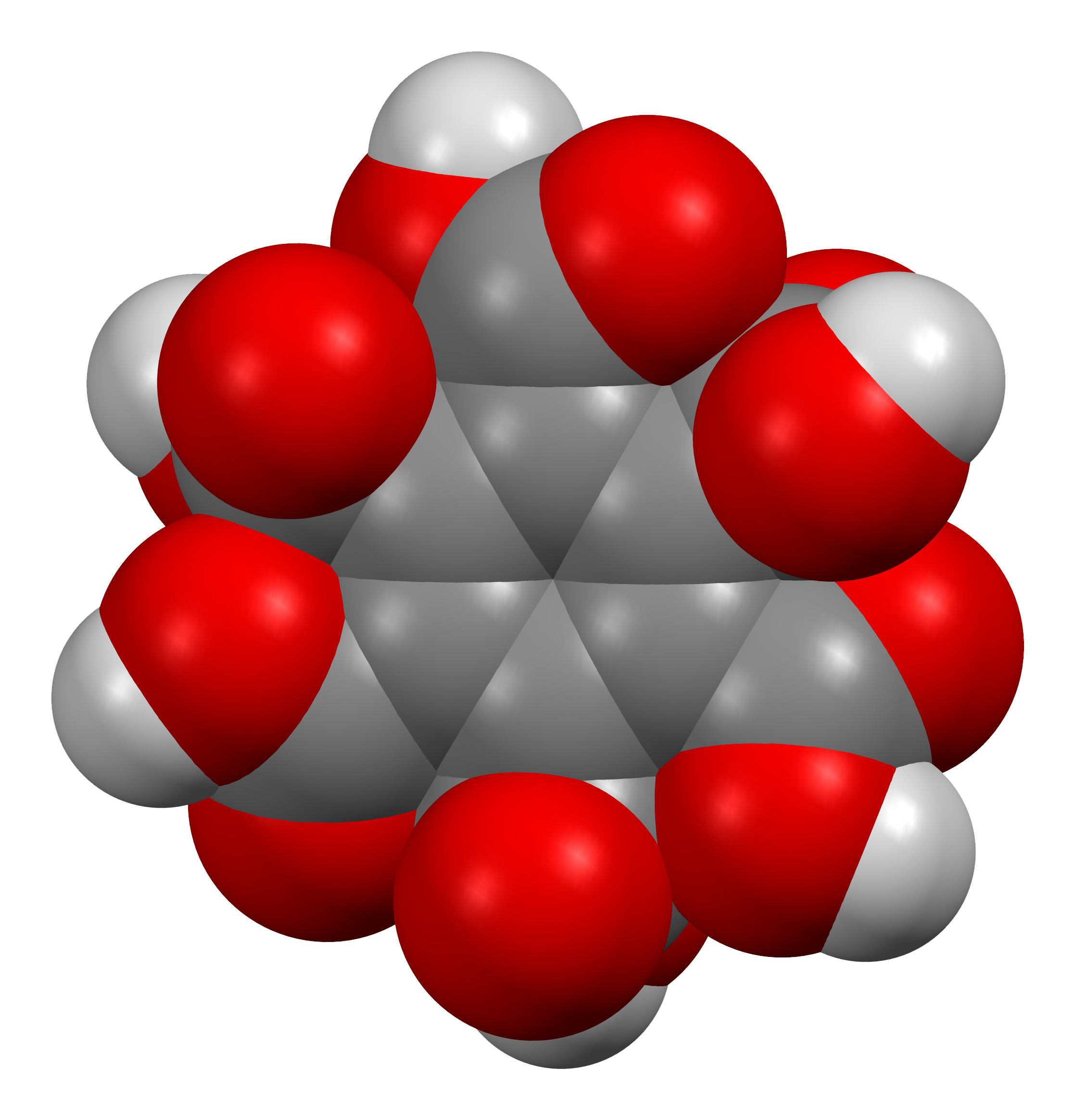
Space-filling model

Names
- Preferred IUPAC name Benzenehexacarboxylic acid
- Other names Graphitic acid

Identifiers
CAS Number	517-60-2
3D model (JSmol)	Interactive image
ChEBI	CHEBI:41089
ChEMBL	ChEMBL1231329
ChemSpider	2244
DrugBank	DB01681
ECHA InfoCard	100.007.495
PubChem CID	2334
UNII	P80QSP14DM
CompTox Dashboard (EPA)	DTXSID50199650
- InChI: InChI=1S/C12H6O12/c13-7(14)1-2(8(15)16)4(10(19)20)6(12(23)24)5(11(21)22)3(1)9(17)18/h(H,13,14)(H,15,16)(H,17,18)(H,19,20)(H,21,22)(H,23,24) Key: YDSWCNNOKPMOTP-UHFFFAOYSA-N; InChI=1/C12H6O12/c13-7(14)1-2(8(15)16)4(10(19)20)6(12(23)24)5(11(21)22)3(1)9(17)18/h(H,13,14)(H,15,16)(H,17,18)(H,19,20)(H,21,22)(H,23,24) Key: YDSWCNNOKPMOTP-UHFFFAOYAB
- SMILES: O=C(O)c1c(c(c(c(c1C(=O)O)C(=O)O)C(=O)O)C(=O)O)C(=O)O

Properties
Chemical formula	C_{12}H_{6}O_{12}
Molar mass	342.168 g·mol^{−1}
Density	1.68 g/cm^{3}, 2.078 (calc.)
Melting point	> 300 °C (572 °F; 573 K)
Boiling point	678 °C (1,252 °F; 951 K) (calc.)
Acidity (pK_{a})	1.40, 2.19, 3.31, 4.78, 5.89, 6.96
- Except where otherwise noted, data are given for materials in their standard state (at 25 °C [77 °F], 100 kPa). verify (what is ?) Infobox references

Mellitic acid, also called graphitic acid or benzenehexacarboxylic acid, is an acid first discovered in 1799 by Martin Heinrich Klaproth in the mineral mellite (honeystone), which is the aluminium salt of the acid. It crystallizes in fine silky needles and is soluble in water and alcohol.

== Structure ==
The stable conformation of this molecule has the carboxylic acid groups rotated out of the plane of the central benzene ring. The molecule adopts a propeller-like conformation in which the tilt of each carboxylic acid group relative to the central benzene ring varies due to intramolecular hydrogen bonding.

== Preparation ==
Mellitic acid may be prepared by warming mellite with ammonium carbonate, boiling off the excess of the ammonium salt, and adding ammonia to the solution. The precipitated alumina is filtered off, the filtrate evaporated, and the ammonium salt of the acid purified by recrystallization. The ammonium salt is then converted into the lead salt by precipitation with lead acetate, and the lead salt is then decomposed by hydrogen sulfide. The acid may also be prepared by the oxidation of pure carbon, graphite or hexamethylbenzene, by alkaline potassium permanganate in the cold, or by hot concentrated nitric acid.

== Reactions ==
Mellitic acid is a very stable compound; chlorine, concentrated nitric acid and hydroiodic acid do not react with it. It is decomposed by pyrolysis or by sulfuric acid into carbon dioxide and pyromellitic acid, C_{10}H_{6}O_{8}; when distilled with lime it gives carbon dioxide and benzene. Long digestion of the acid with an excess of phosphorus pentachloride forms the acid chloride, which crystallizes in needles, and melts at 190 °C. By heating the ammonium salt of the acid to 150–160 °C while ammonia is evolved, a mixture of paramide (mellimide, molecular formula C_{6}(CONHCO)_{3}), and ammonium euchroate is obtained. The mixture may be separated by dissolving out the ammonium euchroate with water. Paramide is a white amorphous powder, insoluble in water and alcohol.

Formation of paramide and ammonium euchroate from ammonium mellitate.

The high stability of mellitic acid salts and their presence as an endproduct of the oxidation of polycyclic aromatic hydrocarbons, which are present in the Solar System, make them a possible organic substance in Martian soil.

Mellitates (and salts of other benzene polycarboxylic acids) of iron and cobalt have interesting magnetic properties.

== See also ==
- Mellitic anhydride
