= 2-(Dicyanomethylene)croconate =

Ion

- 2-(dicyanomethylene)croconate dianion

Names
- Preferred IUPAC name 4-(Dicyanomethylidene)-3,5-dioxocyclopen-1-ene-1,2-bis(olate)

Identifiers
3D model (JSmol)	Interactive image
ChemSpider	26234929
PubChem CID	139033599
CompTox Dashboard (EPA)	DTXSID701029307
- InChI: InChI=1S/C8H2N2O4/c9-1-3(2-10)4-5(11)7(13)8(14)6(4)12/h13-14H/p-2 Key: UOFODKSWJURJDQ-UHFFFAOYSA-L
- SMILES: C(#N)C(=C1C(=O)C(=C(C1=O)[O-])[O-])C#N

Properties
Chemical formula	C_{8}N_{2}O_{4}^{2−}
Molar mass	188.099 g·mol^{−1}
- Except where otherwise noted, data are given for materials in their standard state (at 25 °C [77 °F], 100 kPa). Infobox references

2-(Dicyanomethylene)croconate is a divalent anion with chemical formula C_{8}N_{2}O^{2−}_{4} or ((N≡C−)_{2}C=)(C_{5}O_{4})^{2−}. It is one of the pseudo-oxocarbon anions, as it can be described as a derivative of the croconate oxocarbon anion C_{5}O^{2−}_{5} through the replacement of one oxygen atom by a dicyanomethylene group =C(−C≡N)_{2}.

The anion was synthesized and characterized by A. Fatiadi in 1980, by hydrolysis of croconate violet treated with potassium hydroxide. It gives an orange solution in water.

== See also ==
- Croconate violet, 1,3-bis(dicyanomethylene)croconate
- Croconate blue, 1,2,3-tris(dicyanomethylene)croconate
- 1,2-Bis(dicyanomethylene)squarate
- 1,3-Bis(dicyanomethylene)squarate
