= C4H4O2 =

The molecular formula C_{4}H_{4}O_{2} may refer to:

- Cyclobutanediones
  - 1,2-Cyclobutanedione
  - 1,3-Cyclobutanedione
- Cycloprop-2-ene carboxylic acid
- Diketene
- Dioxins
  - 1,2-Dioxin
  - 1,4-Dioxin
- 2-Furanone
- Methyl propiolate
- Tetrolic acid
