= Deltic =

Deltic or Deltics may refer to:

- Napier Deltic, a diesel engine
  - British Rail DP1 ("Deltic") a prototype locomotive built by English Electric fitted with the Deltic Engine
  - British Rail Class 55, production locomotives powered by Deltic engines
  - British Rail Class 23, "Baby Deltic" production locomotives powered by Deltic engines
  - Deltic Preservation Society
- Deltic acid, a chemical whose molecular backbone resembles the Greek letter delta (Δ)
- Deltaic or deltic
- Deltics (album), a music album by Chris Rea

== See also ==
- Delta (disambiguation)
- Deltate (disambiguation)
- Deltoid (disambiguation)
