= Deltate =

The word deltate, in its most common senses, is derived from the Greek delta (letter), specifically the capital form (Δ). It may mean:

- In biology, a triangular leaf shape.
- In chemistry, a salt of deltic acid, which has three carbon atoms connected in a triangle.

== See also ==
- Deltoid (disambiguation)
- River delta
- Deltic (disambiguation)
