= Deltoid tubercle =

Deltoid tubercle may refer to:

- Deltoid tubercle of spine of scapula
- Deltoid tuberosity of humerus
- Deltoid tubercle of clavicle
