= Alopecia universalis =

Loss of all body hair

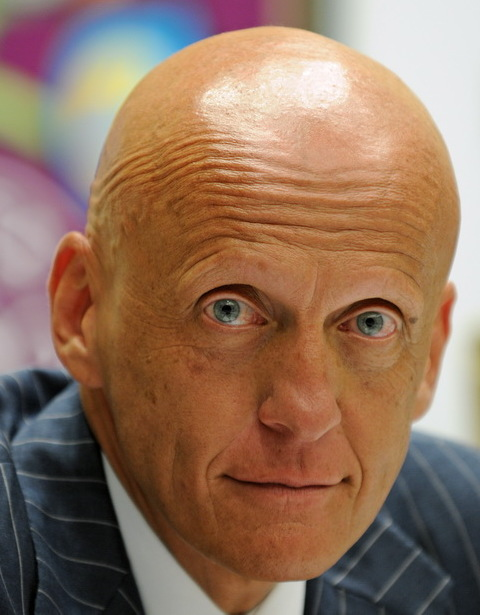
- Former association football referee Pierluigi Collina with alopecia universalis
- Specialty: Dermatology
- Symptoms: Loss of all body hair
- Usual onset: Any age
- Medication: Clobetasol propionate
- Prognosis: Normal life expectancy

Alopecia universalis (AU), also known as alopecia areata universalis, is a medical condition involving the loss of all body hair, including eyebrows, eyelashes, chest hair, armpit hair, and pubic hair. It is the most severe form of alopecia areata (AA). People with the condition are usually healthy and have no other symptoms and a normal life expectancy.

== Causes ==
Alopecia universalis can occur at any age, and is currently believed to be an autoimmune disorder, in which a person's immune system attacks the hair follicles. Genetic factors may contribute to AU, as about 20% of those affected have a family member with alopecia.

== Treatment ==
Many treatments have been explored, including immunomodulatory agents such as imiquimod. Tofacitinib citrate may also have benefits. In June 2014, a 25-year-old man with almost no hair on his body was reported to have grown a full head of hair, as well as eyebrows, eyelashes, and facial, armpit, and other hair, following eight months of treatment. However, there is no single accepted therapy which has systematically proven to be effective and for which the benefits would outweigh the costs (e.g., Tofacitinib is expensive and has side effects; treatment effects disappear with discontinuation of treatment).

Contact immunotherapy involves the use of contact allergens, such as diphencyprone and squaric acid dibutylester, to induce an immune response that is thought to oppose the action of cells causing hair loss. A review that combined and analyzed the findings of 45 studies comprising 2,227 patients showed any hair regrowth in 54.5% and complete hair regrowth in 24.9% of patients with AT and AU using contact immunotherapy. In addition to its helpful effects in treating AU, it can have side effects that can be very serious, such as severe dermatitis.

Topical and intralesional corticosteroids, such as clobetasol propionate, have also shown to be an effective treatment for AT and AU patients. A controlled study comprising 28 patients found positive terminal hair growth in eight of the patients (28.5%) using a 0.05% clobetasol propionate ointment. This is very similar to the results obtained from immunotherapy treatment trials. Additionally, studies suggest that intralesional applications are much more effective than topical applications of steroids. However, the main side effect is increased risk of cutaneous atrophy at the site of treatment; folliculitis is also an occasional complication.

Janus kinase inhibitors, previously used in the treatment of cancer and other diseases, such as arthritis, have successfully shown to be effective in the initial trials of treatment for alopecia patients. Multiple cases of treatments have been successful, one of them being of a 22-year-old man with a history of AU and atopic dermatitis (AD). This man was treated with JAK inhibitor tofacitinib, and after ten months, he experienced hair regrowth on all of his affected body parts and subsequent improvement of his AD. Current research and findings suggest that systemic JAK inhibitors eliminate and prevent the development of AA, while topical JAK inhibitors promote hair regrowth and reverse the established disease. Many clinical trials are ongoing involving JAK inhibitors such as ruxolitinib and tofacitinib.

== See also ==
- Alopecia areata
- Alopecia totalis
