= Croconate violet =

Croconate violet

Croconate violet or 1,3-bis(dicyanomethylene)croconate is a divalent anion with chemical formula C_{11}N_{4}O^{2−}_{3} or ((N≡C−)_{2}C=)_{2}(C_{5}O_{3})^{2−}. It is one of the pseudo-oxocarbon anions, as it can be described as a derivative of the croconate oxocarbon anion C_{5}O^{2−}_{5} through the replacement of two oxygen atoms by dicyanomethylene groups =C(−C≡N)_{2}. Its systematic name is 3,5-bis(dicyanomethylene)-1,2,4-trionate. The term croconate violet as a dye name specifically refers to the dipotassium salt K_{2}C_{11}N_{4}O_{3}.

== History and synthesis ==
The anion was synthesized and characterized by Alexander Fatiadi in 1978. He obtained the potassium salt by treating dipotassium croconate K_{2}C_{5}O_{5} with malononitrile in water solution at 80–90 °C. The dipotassium salt crystallizes from water as a dihydrate in deep blue metallic needles. The water solutions have an intense violet color and strongly stain the skin.

== Croconic acid violet ==
The croconate violet anion is the conjugate base of the acid croconic acid violet C_{11}H_{2}N_{4}O_{3}, also obtained by Fatiadi in 1978 by treating the potassium salt with hydrochloric acid. It is an orange crystalline solid that melts at 260–270 °C and dissolves in water to give violet skin-staining solutions. It strongly acidic (pK_{a1} = 0.32 ± 0.02, pK_{a2} = 1.02 ± 0.02). From this acid other alkali metal salts can be prepared. The acid cannot be prepared directly from croconic acid and malononitrile; croconate blue is obtained instead.

== Properties ==
Croconate violet salts are dyes with strong absorptions in the UV–visible region. Solutions of the acid or of the dipotassium salt strongly stain the skin. It retains the aromatic character and some other properties of the croconate anion.

Croconate violet salts also have interesting electrochemical, semiconducting and photophysical properties, and have been the subject of research in supramolecular chemistry. The dipotassium salt for example is a semiconductor with electrical conductivity 2 × 10^{−4} S cm^{−1}.

The lithium salt is very soluble in water. The rubidium salt Rb_{2}C_{11}N_{4}O_{3} and the mixed rubidium-potassium salt Rb_{1.4}K_{0.6}C_{11}N_{4}O_{3} crystallize as deep blue dihydrates in the triclinic space group, with the same structure. In these solids the croconate violet anion is almost planar, with the dicyanomethylene groups slightly twisted out of the mean plane. The aromatic character of the croconate core is retained or even enhanced, with strongly delocalized π electrons. The tetra-n-butylammonium salt (N(C_{4}H_{9})_{4})_{2}C_{11}N_{4}O_{3} is an anhydrous metallic green solid, stable to 225 °C, that is highly soluble in organic solvents (in contrast to the dipotassium salt).

The mixed salts of potassium and of certain trivalent lanthanides cations (lanthanum, neodymium, gadolinium, and holmium) exhibit some degree of π-stacking interactions; namely, the π electrons of the croconate rings in one layer form weak bonds with those in the adjacent layers. In the anhydrous tetrabutylammonium salt the anions are separated by more than 12 Å and no π-stacking occurs.

== See also ==
- 2-(Dicyanomethylene)croconate
- Croconate blue, 1,2,3-tris(dicyanomethylene)croconate
- 1,2-bis(dicyanomethylene)squarate
- 1,3-bis(dicyanomethylene)squarate
