= Pseudo-oxocarbon anion =

In chemistry, the term pseudo-oxocarbon anion is used to refer to a negative ion that is conceptually derived from an oxocarbon anion through replacement of one or more of the basic oxygen atoms by chemically similar elements or functional groups, such as sulfur (S), selenium (Se), or dicyanomethylene (=C(CN)_{2}).

Typical examples are the anions 2-(Dicyanomethylene)croconate, croconate violet, and croconate blue, derived from the croconate anion C_{5}O^{2−}_{5} by replacing one, two, or three oxygen atoms by dicyanomethylene groups:

Croconate	2-Dicyanomethylene- croconate	Croconate violet	Croconate blue

These anions retain many of the properties of the parent, including the delocalized bond in the ring and the delocalized charge in the atoms attached to the ring. Similar anions can be obtained from squarate C_{4}O^{2−}_{4}.

== See also ==
- 1,2-bis(dicyanomethylene)squarate
- 1,3-bis(dicyanomethylene)squarate
