= Squaric acid =

Structural formula (carbon atoms omitted)
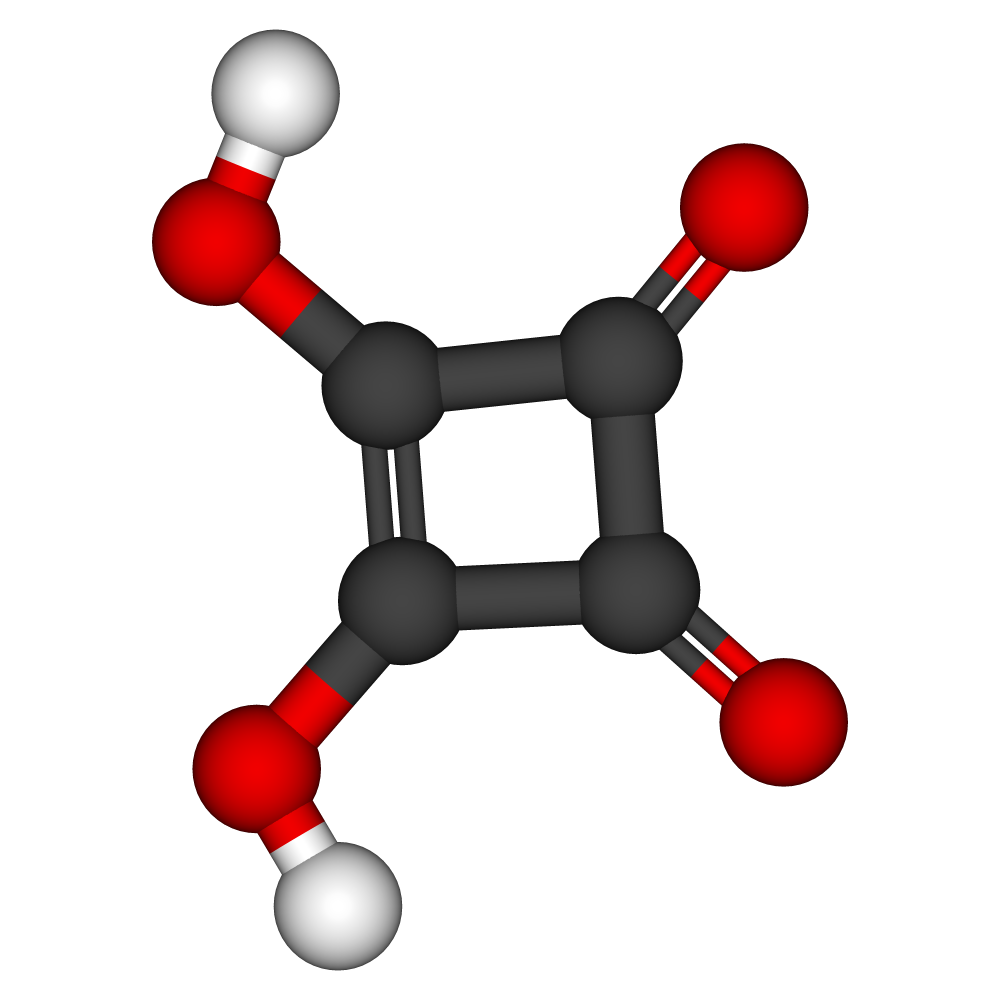
Ball-and-stick-model

Names
- Preferred IUPAC name 3,4-Dihydroxycyclobut-3-ene-1,2-dione
- Other names Quadratic acid Cyclobutenedioic acid

Identifiers
CAS Number	2892-51-5
3D model (JSmol)	Interactive image
ChemSpider	16919
ECHA InfoCard	100.018.875
EC Number	220-761-4
PubChem CID	17913
UNII	SVR9D0VODW
CompTox Dashboard (EPA)	DTXSID9049409
- InChI: InChI=1S/C4H2O4/c5-1-2(6)4(8)3(1)7/h5-6H Key: PWEBUXCTKOWPCW-UHFFFAOYSA-N; InChI=1/C4H2O4/c5-1-2(6)4(8)3(1)7/h5-6H Key: PWEBUXCTKOWPCW-UHFFFAOYAC
- SMILES: c1(c(c(=O)c1=O)O)O

Properties
Chemical formula	C_{4}H_{2}O_{4}
Molar mass	114.056 g·mol^{−1}
Appearance	white crystalline powder
Melting point	> 300 °C (572 °F; 573 K)
Acidity (pK_{a})	pK_{a1} = 1.5 pK_{a2} = 3.4

Hazards
- GHS labelling
Pictograms	(GHS05: Corrosive)
Signal word	Danger
Hazard statements	H314
Precautionary statements	P260, P280, P301+P330+P331, P303+P361+P353, P304+P340+P310, P305+P351+P338
Flash point	190 °C (374 °F; 463 K)
- Except where otherwise noted, data are given for materials in their standard state (at 25 °C [77 °F], 100 kPa). verify (what is ?) Infobox references

Squaric acid or quadratic acid (so named because its four carbon atoms approximately form a square) is a diprotic organic acid with the chemical formula C_{4}O_{2}(OH)_{2}.

The conjugate base of squaric acid is the hydrogensquarate anion HC_{4}O^{−}_{4}; and the conjugate base of the hydrogensquarate anion is the divalent squarate anion C_{4}O^{2−}_{4}. This is one of the oxocarbon anions, which consist only of carbon and oxygen.

Squaric acid is a reagent for chemical synthesis. Derivatives are dyes and biochemical agents.

== Chemical properties ==
Squaric acid is a white crystalline powder. The onset of thermal decomposition depends on the different thermodynamic conditions such as heating rates.

The structure of squaric acid is not a perfect square, as the carbon–carbon bond lengths are not quite equal. The high acidity with pK_{a1} = 1.5 for the first proton and pK_{a2} = 3.4 for the second is attributable to resonance stabilization of the anion:

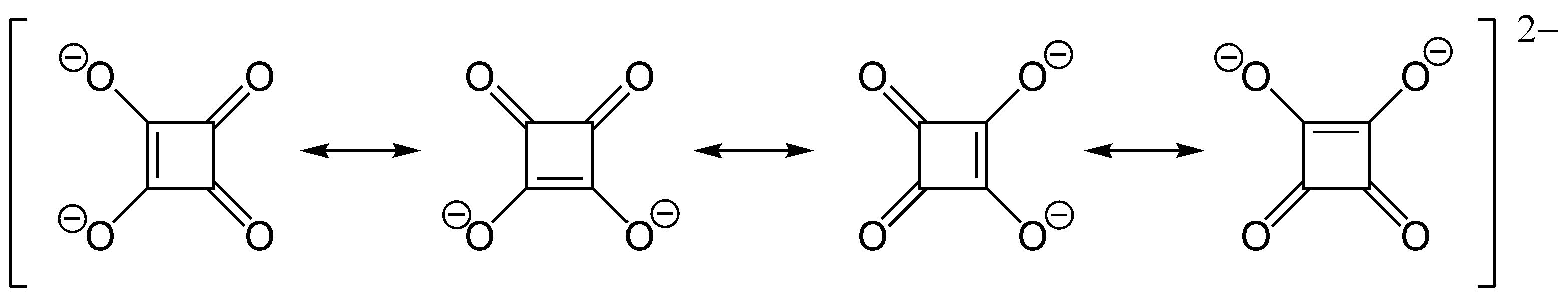
Squaric acid dianion resonance forms

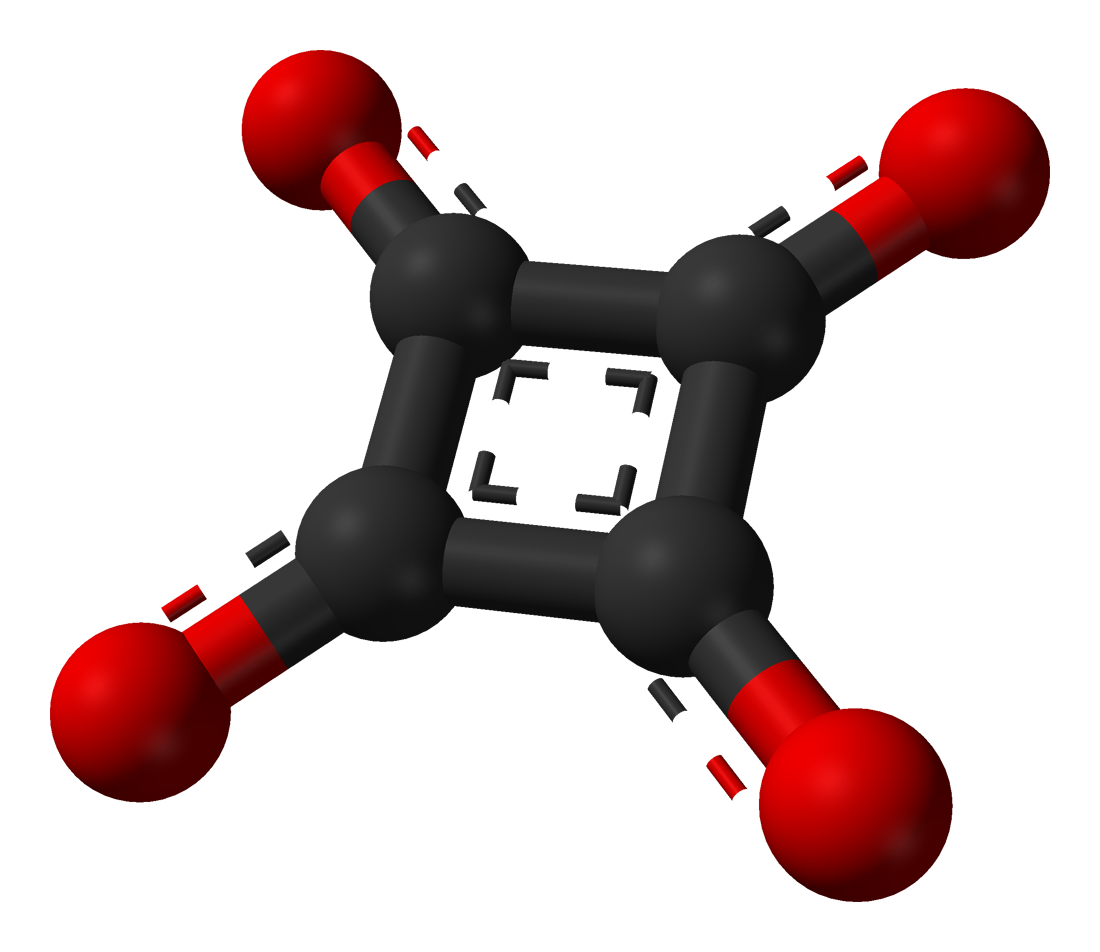
Ball-and-stick model of the squarate ion

Because the negative charges are equally distributed between each oxygen atom, the dianion of squaric acid is completely symmetrical (unlike squaric acid itself) with all C−C bond lengths identical and all C−O bond lengths identical.

== Derivatives ==
Many of the reactions of squaric acid involve the OH groups. The molecule behaves similarly to a strong dicarboxylic acid. It is stronger acid than typical carboxylic acids.

C_{4}O_{2}(OH)_{2} → [C_{4}O_{3}(OH)]^{−} + H^{+}, pK_{a1} = 1.5
[C_{4}O_{3}(OH)]^{−} → [C_{4}O_{4}]^{2−} + H^{+}, pK_{a2} = 3.5

The OH groups are labile, and squaric acid forms a dichloride with thionyl chloride:

C_{4}O_{2}(OH)_{2} + 2 SOCl_{2} → C_{4}O_{2}Cl_{2} + 2 HCl + 2 SO_{2}

The chlorides leave easily, reminiscent of acid chlorides. They are displaced by diverse nucleophiles. In this way dithiosquarate can be prepared.

The bis(methylether) is prepared by alkylation with trimethyl orthoformate.

Dibutyl squarate is used for the treatment of warts and for alopecia areata.

Diethyl squarate has been used as an intermediate in the synthesis of perzinfotel.

Squaramides are prepared by displacement of alkoxy or chloride groups from C_{4}O_{2}X_{2} (X = OR, Cl). Likewise, reaction with arenes gives photosensitive squaraine dyes.

Other derivatives inhibit of protein tyrosine phosphatases.

One or both of the oxygen (=O) groups in the squarate anion can be replaced by dicyanomethylene =C(CN)_{2}. The resulting anions, such as 1,2-bis(dicyanomethylene)squarate and 1,3-bis(dicyanomethylene)squarate, retain the aromatic character of squarate and have been called pseudo-oxocarbon anions.

Photolysis of squaric acid in a solid argon matrix at 10 K (−263 °C) affords acetylenediol.

=== Coordination complexes ===
The squarate dianion behaves similarly to oxalate, forming mono- and polynuclear complexes with hard metal ions. Cobalt(II) squarate hydrate Co(C_{4}O_{4})·2H_{2}O (yellow, cubic) can be prepared by autoclaving cobalt(II) hydroxide and squaric acid in water at 200 °C. The water is bound to the cobalt atom, and the crystal structure consists of a cubic arrangement of hollow cells, whose walls are either six squarate anions (leaving a 7 Å wide void) or several water molecules (leaving a 5 Å void).

Cobalt(II) squarate dihydroxide Co_{3}(OH)_{2}(C_{4}O_{4})_{2}·3H_{2}O (brown) is obtained together with the previous compound. It has a columnar structure including channels filled with water molecules; these can be removed and replaced without destroying the crystal structure. The chains are ferromagnetic; they are coupled antiferromagnetically in the hydrated form, ferromagnetically in the anhydrous form.

Copper(II) squarate monomeric and dimeric mixed-ligand complexes were synthesized and characterized. Infrared, electronic and Q-Band EPR spectra as well as magnetic susceptibilities are reported.

The same method yields iron(II) squarate dihydroxide Fe_{2}(OH)_{2}(C_{4}O_{4}) (light brown).

== Synthesis ==
The original synthesis started with the ethanolysis of hexafluorocyclobutene to give 1,2-diethoxy-3,3,4,4-tetrafluoro-1-cyclobutene. Acid hydrolysis then gives squaric acid. In industry, acetylsquaraine from ketene is trihalogenated with e.g. bromine; acid hydrolysis then gives again the squaric acid product.

Although impractical, squarate and related anions such as deltate C_{3}O^{2−}_{3} and acetylenediolate C_{2}O^{2−}_{2} are obtainable by reductive coupling of carbon monoxide using organouranium complexes.

== See also ==
- Acetylenediol, H_{2}(CO)_{2} or HO−C≡C−OH
- Deltic acid, H_{2}(CO)_{3}
- Croconic acid, H_{2}(CO)_{5}
- Rhodizonic acid, H_{2}(CO)_{6}
- Cyclopropenone, C_{3}H_{2}O
- Cyclobutene, C_{4}H_{6}
- Squaramide, C_{4}O_{2}(NH_{2})_{2}, a nitrogen analog of squaric acid, where the OH groups of squaric acid are replaced by NH_{2} groups
- Moniliformin, NaC_{4}HO_{3}, the sodium salt of semisquaric acid
