= Croconate blue =

Croconate blue

Croconate blue or 1,2,3-tris(dicyanomethylene)croconate is a divalent anion with chemical formula C_{14}N_{6}O^{2−}_{2} or ((N≡C−)_{2}C=)_{3}(C_{5}O_{2})^{2−}. It is one of the pseudo-oxocarbon anions, as it can be described as a derivative of the croconate oxocarbon anion C_{5}O^{2−}_{5} through the replacement of three oxygen atoms by dicyanomethylene groups =C(−C≡N)_{2}. The term Croconate Blue as a dye name specifically refers to the dipotassium salt K_{2}C_{14}N_{6}O_{2}.

== History and synthesis ==
The anion was synthesized and characterized by A. Fatiadi in 1978, together with croconate violet. He obtained the corresponding acid, croconate acid blue C_{14}H_{2}N_{6}O_{2} by treating croconic acid C_{5}H_{2}O_{5} with malononitrile in water solution at 80–90 °C.

== Properties ==
=== Croconate acid blue ===
Croconate acid blue is strongly acidic (pK_{a1} ≈ 1). It crystallizes from water as a purple sesquihydrate C_{14}H_{2}N_{6}O_{2}·1 1/2H_{2}O and gives a red solution in acetone or ethanol, but deep blue in water. It hydrolyzes slowly in water to give croconic acid violet. Extended heating in water produces deep green plates, apparently a polymer. Croconate acid blue retains the aromatic character and some other properties of the croconate anion.

=== Croconate blue dianion ===
Unlike croconate violet, the croconate blue dianion is not planar; the three dicyanomethylene groups are twisted by about 30 degrees from the ring plane.

The dipotassium salt is obtained from the acid by treatment with potassium methoxide from water as a green-blue trihydrate, that slowly loses water converting to the dihydrate. The water solutions have an intense blue color. It quickly converts to croconate violet when treated with potassium hydroxide. It is a weak semiconductor with conductivity 10^{−7} S cm^{−1} at room temperature.

The bis(tetramethylammonium) salt ((CH_{3})_{4})_{2}C_{14}N_{6}O_{2} is green-blue and crystallizes as the dihydrate.

== See also ==
- 2-(Dicyanomethylene)croconate
- Croconate violet, 1,3-bis(dicyanomethylene)croconate
- 1,2-bis(dicyanomethylene)squarate
- 1,3-bis(dicyanomethylene)squarate
