= DPCP =

DPCP may refer to:

- Diphenylcyclopropenone, an experimental drug for alopecia
- DisplayPort Content Protection, a feature of the DisplayPort digital interface
