= Cyclobutanedione =

Cyclobutanedione may refer to:

- 1,2-Cyclobutanedione
- 1,3-Cyclobutanedione
