= Delotid =

Delotid may be a misspelling of:

- Dilaudid, an opioid pain medication
- Deltoid (disambiguation)
