= C2H2O =

The molecular formula C_{2}H_{2}O (molar mass: 42.04 g/mol, exact mass: 42.0106 u) may refer to:

- Ethenone, or ketene
- Ethynol, or hydroxylacetylene
- Oxirene
