= Alkynol =

Type of organic chemical compound

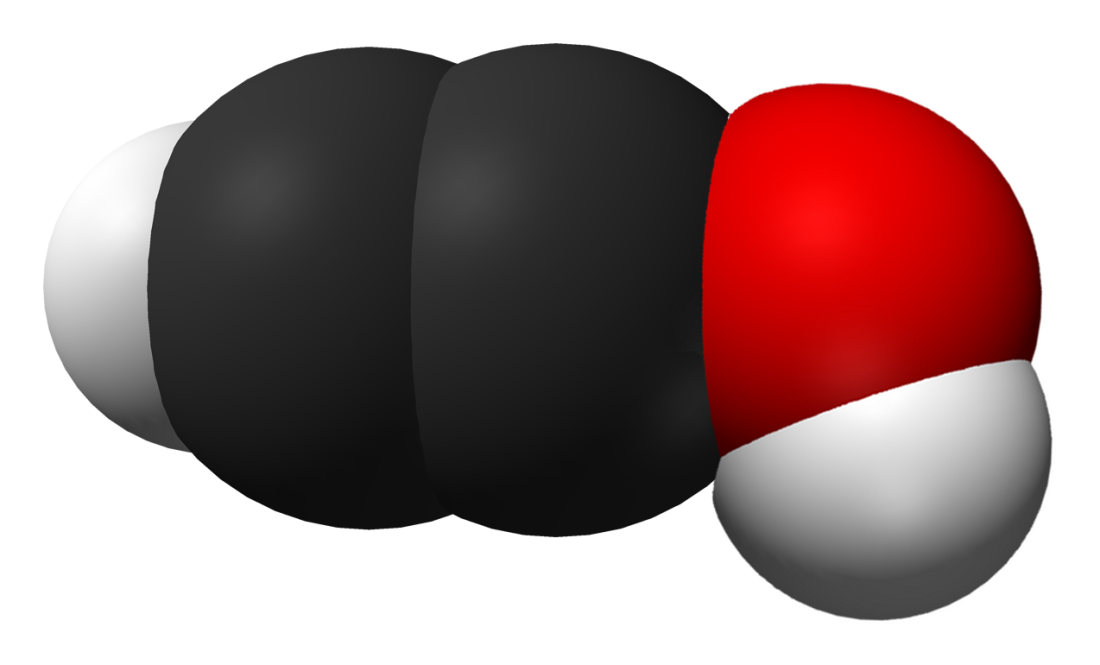
Ethynol, the simplest ynol

In organic chemistry, alkynols (hydroxyalkynes) are organic compounds that contain both alkyne and alcohol functional groups. Thus, as structural features, they have a C≡C triple bond and a hydroxyl group. Some alkynols play a role as intermediates in the chemical industry.

The shortened term ynol typically refers to alkynols with the hydroxyl group affixed to one of the two carbon atoms composing the triple bond (C≡C−OH), the triple-bond analogues to enols. Ynols can tautomerize to ketenes.

The deprotonated anions of ynols are known as ynolates, the triple-bond analogues to enolates.

== Synthesis ==
Alkynols may be formed by the alkynylation of carbonyl compounds, usually in liquid ammonia.

== Ynolates ==
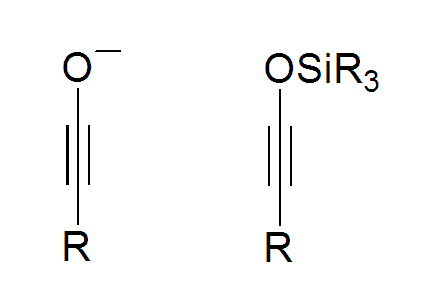
The molecular structure of an ynolate (left) and a generic silyl derivative (right)

Ynolates are chemical compounds with a negatively charged oxygen atom attached to an alkyne functionality. They were first synthesized in 1975 by Schöllkopf and Hoppe via the n-butyllithium fragmentation of 3,4-diphenylisoxazole.

Synthetically, they behave as ketene precursors or synthons.

== Ynol–ketene tautomerism ==
Ynols can interconvert with ketenes, much like enols can with aldehydes and ketones. The ynol tautomer is usually unstable, does not survive long, and changes into the ketene. This is because oxygen is more electronegative than carbon and thus forms stronger bonds. For instance, ethynol quickly interconverts with ethenone:

Ynol-ketene tautomers
Ethynol	Ethenone

== Literature ==
- Allinger, Cava, de Jongh, Johnson, Lebel, Stevens: Organische Chemie, 1. Auflage, Walter de Gruyter, Berlin 1980, ISBN 3-11-004594-X, p. 749.
- Beyer / Walter: Lehrbuch der Organischen Chemie, 19. Auflage, S. Hirzel Verlag, Stuttgart 1981, ISBN 3-7776-0356-2, pp. 98–99, 122.
- K. Peter C. Vollhardt, Neil E. Schore: Organische Chemie, 4. Auflage, Wiley-VCH, Weinheim 2005, ISBN 978-3-527-31380-8, p. 632.

== See also ==
- Thioynol
