= Dibutyl squarate =

Names
- IUPAC name 3,4-Dibutoxy-3-cyclobutene-1,2-dione
- Other names Squaric acid dibutyl ester; SADBE

Identifiers
CAS Number	2892-62-8
3D model (JSmol)	Interactive image
Beilstein Reference	1968189
ChEBI	CHEBI:53612
ChEMBL	ChEMBL2435707
ChemSpider	58618
DrugBank	DB12223
ECHA InfoCard	100.157.137
EC Number	628-906-7
PubChem CID	65108
UNII	4RTO57VG65
CompTox Dashboard (EPA)	DTXSID30183113
- InChI: InChI=1S/C12H18O4/c1-3-5-7-15-11-9(13)10(14)12(11)16-8-6-4-2/h3-8H2,1-2H3 Key: XBRWELTXMQSEIN-UHFFFAOYSA-N
- SMILES: CCCCOC1=C(C(=O)C1=O)OCCCC

Properties
Chemical formula	C_{12}H_{18}O_{4}
Molar mass	226.272 g·mol^{−1}

Hazards
- GHS labelling
Pictograms	(GHS07: Exclamation mark)
Signal word	Warning
Hazard statements	H315, H317, H319, H335
Precautionary statements	P261, P264, P264+P265, P271, P272, P280, P302+P352, P304+P340, P305+P351+P338, P319, P321, P332+P317, P333+P313, P337+P317, P362+P364, P403+P233, P405, P501
- Except where otherwise noted, data are given for materials in their standard state (at 25 °C [77 °F], 100 kPa). Infobox references

Dibutyl squarate (also known as squaric acid dibutyl ester or SADBE) is a chemical compound with the molecular formula C_{12}H_{18}O_{4}. It is the dibutyl derivative of squaric acid.

Medically, it is used for the treatment of warts and for treating alopecia areata or alopecia totalis (autoimmune hair loss) through topical immunotherapy involving the production of an allergic rash. Dibutyl squarate is currently undergoing trials for use in treating herpes labialis (cold sores).
