= Squaraine dye =

Class of organic molecules

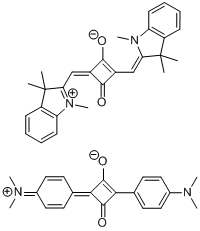
(top) a 1,2,3,3-tetramethyl-3H-indolium salt and (bottom) aniline derivative of squaraine dyes

Squaraine dyes are a class of organic dyes showing intense fluorescence, typically in the red and near infrared region (absorption maxima are found between 630 and 670 nm and their emission maxima are between 650 and 700 nm). They are characterized by their unique aromatic four membered ring system derived from squaric acid. Most squaraines are encumbered by nucleophilic attack of the central four membered ring, which is highly electron deficient. This encumbrance can be attenuated by the formation of a rotaxane around the dye to protect it from nucleophiles. They are currently used as sensors for ions and have recently, with the advent of protected squaraine derivatives, been exploited in biomedical imaging.

== Synthesis ==
Synthesis of squaraine dyes was reported at least in 1966. They are derived from squaric acid which undergoes an electrophilic aromatic substitution reaction with an aniline or another electron rich derivative to form a highly conjugated product with extensive charge distribution. For instance, squaraine dyes are also formed via reaction of squaric acid or its derivatives with so-called "methylene bases" like 2-methyl-indolenines, 2-methyl-benzthiazoles or 2-methyl-benzo-selenazoles. Indolenine-based squaraines combine good photostability including high quantum yields when bound to proteins and reactive versions of these dyes are commonly used as fluorescent probes and labels for biomedical applications.

== Fluorescence ==
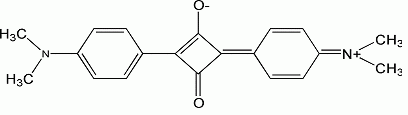
Structure of squarylium dye

Squarylium dyes are soluble in dichloromethane; it is soluble in few other solvents. Their absorption peaks at ~630 nm and luminescence at ~650 nm. The luminescence is photochemically stable and its quantum yield is ~0.65.

Squarylium dye molecules can be encapsulated into carbon nanotubes enhancing the optical properties of carbon nanotubes. Efficient energy transfer occurs between the encapsulated dye and nanotube — light is absorbed by the dye and without significant loss is transferred to the nanotubes. Encapsulation increases chemical and thermal stability of squarylium molecules; it also allows their isolation and individual characterization. For example, encapsulation of dye molecules inside carbon nanotubes completely quenches strong dye luminescence, thus allowing measurement and analysis of their Raman spectra.

== See also ==
- Squaric acid
