= 1,2-Cyclobutanedione =

Names
- Preferred IUPAC name Cyclobutane-1,2-dione

Identifiers
CAS Number	33689-28-0
3D model (JSmol)	Interactive image
ChemSpider	125115
ECHA InfoCard	100.187.120
PubChem CID	141827
CompTox Dashboard (EPA)	DTXSID80187368
- InChI: InChI=1S/C4H4O2/c5-3-1-2-4(3)6/h1-2H2 Key: QDMRCCGQLCIMLG-UHFFFAOYSA-N
- SMILES: C1CC(=O)C1=O

Properties
Chemical formula	C_{4}H_{4}O_{2}
Molar mass	84.074 g·mol^{−1}
Appearance	yellow solid
Melting point	65 °C (149 °F; 338 K)
- Except where otherwise noted, data are given for materials in their standard state (at 25 °C [77 °F], 100 kPa). Infobox references

1,2-Cyclobutanedione is an organic compound with the formula (CH_{2})_{2}(CO)_{2}. It is one of two isomers of cyclobutanedione, the other being 1,3-cyclobutanedione. It is prone to polymerization. It is prepared by oxidative desilylation of 1,2-bis(trimethylsiloxy)cyclobutene.

== Related compounds ==
- Moniliformin, a naturally occurring derivative of 1,2-butanedione
