= Di-tert-butoxyacetylene =

Names
- Other names Di-tert-butoxyethyne

Identifiers
CAS Number	66478-63-5
3D model (JSmol)	Interactive image
ChemSpider	26534856
PubChem CID	12388026
UNII	UN5E5W2CT8
CompTox Dashboard (EPA)	DTXSID60495857
- InChI: InChI=1S/C10H18O2/c1-9(2,3)11-7-8-12-10(4,5)6/h1-6H3 Key: PPVDJWLEHWYMCQ-UHFFFAOYSA-N
- SMILES: CC(C)(C)OC#COC(C)(C)C

Properties
Chemical formula	C_{10}H_{18}O_{2}
Molar mass	170.252 g·mol^{−1}
Appearance	pale yellow oil
Melting point	8.5 °C (47.3 °F; 281.6 K)
Boiling point	30 °C (86 °F; 303 K) 0.05 mm
- Except where otherwise noted, data are given for materials in their standard state (at 25 °C [77 °F], 100 kPa). Infobox references

Di-tert-butoxyacetylene is the organic compound with the formula (CH_{3})_{3}COC≡COC(CH_{3})_{3}. It is a pale yellow liquid. It is one of the more common dialkoxyacetylenes; most other dialkoxyacetylenes are very labile, for example, dimethoxyacetylene polymerizes within seconds at 0 °C. Di-tert-butoxyacetylene can be prepared from 1,4-dioxane in a multistep procedure.
