= 1,3-Cyclobutanedione =

Names
- Preferred IUPAC name Cyclobutane-1,3-dione

Identifiers
CAS Number	1,3-cyclobutanedione tautomer: 15506-53-3; 3-hydroxycyclobut-2-enone: 78675-98-6
3D model (JSmol)	1,3-cyclobutanedione tautomer: Interactive image; 3-hydroxycyclobut-2-enone: Interactive image
ChemSpider	1,3-cyclobutanedione tautomer: 25456; 3-hydroxycyclobut-2-enone: 10004000
PubChem CID	1,3-cyclobutanedione tautomer: 27357; 3-hydroxycyclobut-2-enone: 11829353
CompTox Dashboard (EPA)	1,3-cyclobutanedione tautomer: DTXSID80165803; 3-hydroxycyclobut-2-enone: DTXSID30473940
- InChI: InChI=1S/C4H4O2/c5-3-1-4(6)2-3/h1-2H2 Key: PZQGSZRQKQZCOJ-UHFFFAOYSA-N; 3-hydroxycyclobut-2-enone: InChI=1S/C4H4O2/c5-3-1-4(6)2-3/h1,5H,2H2 Key: IHXWECHPYNPJRR-UHFFFAOYSA-N
- SMILES: 1,3-cyclobutanedione tautomer: C1C(=O)CC1=O; 3-hydroxycyclobut-2-enone: C1C(=CC1=O)O

Properties
Chemical formula	C_{4}H_{4}O_{2}
Molar mass	84.074 g·mol^{−1}
Appearance	colorless or white solid
Density	1.12 g/cm^{3}
Melting point	119–120 °C (246–248 °F; 392–393 K)
- Except where otherwise noted, data are given for materials in their standard state (at 25 °C [77 °F], 100 kPa). Infobox references

1,3-Cyclobutanedione is an organic compound with the formula (CH_{2})_{2}(CO)_{2}. It is an isomer of 1,2-cyclobutanedione. The compound would be of little interest except that its tautomer is a subunit in some commercial dyes.

In solution, 1,3-cyclobutanedione exists in equilibrium with a less stable tautomer, called squaraine, 3-hydroxycyclobut-2-enone. Squaraine dyes are, formally at least, derivatives of squaraine. In such dyes, the ene-one tautomer predominates.

1,3-cyclobutanedione and its enol tautomer.

The mixture of tautomers can be prepared by hydrolysis of 1-ethoxycyclobutene-3-one, which is prepared from the cycloaddition of ethoxyacetylene to ketene.

== Substituted derivatives ==
A variety of substituted 1,3-Cyclobutanediones form upon spontaneous dimerization of disubstituted ketenes. 2,2,4,4-Tetramethylcyclobutanedione is thus formed by dehydrochlorination of isobutyryl chloride:

(CH_{3})_{2}CHCOCl + Et_{3}N → (CH_{3})_{2}C=C=O + Et_{3}NHCl
2 (CH_{3})_{2}C=C=O → (CH_{3})_{2}C)_{2}(C=O)_{2}

Ketene itself dimerizes mainly to give the lactone called diketene as well as a small amount of 1,3-cyclobutanedione.

== Related compounds ==
- Moniliformin, a naturally occurring derivative of 3-hydroxycyclobut-2-enone
