= Deltoid tuberosity =

Bony projection on the humerus where the deltoid muscle inserts

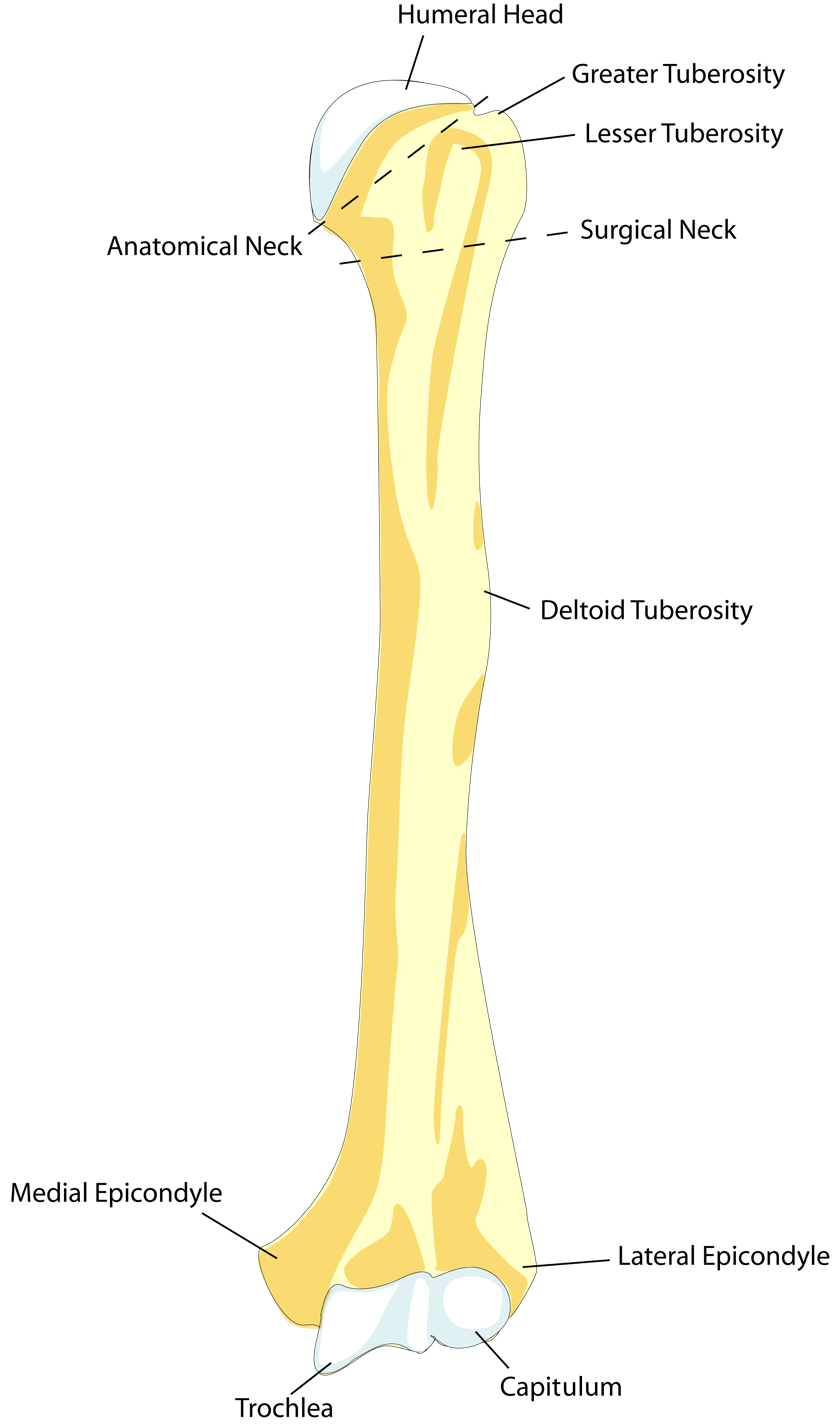
- Left humerus. Anterior view. (Deltoideus labeled at center right.)

Details

Identifiers
- Latin: tuberositas deltoidea humeri
- TA98: A02.4.04.020
- TA2: 1193
- FMA: 23418

In human anatomy, the deltoid tuberosity is a rough, triangular area on the anterolateral (front view, facing away from midline of body) surface of the middle of the humerus. It is a site of attachment of deltoid muscle.

== Structure ==
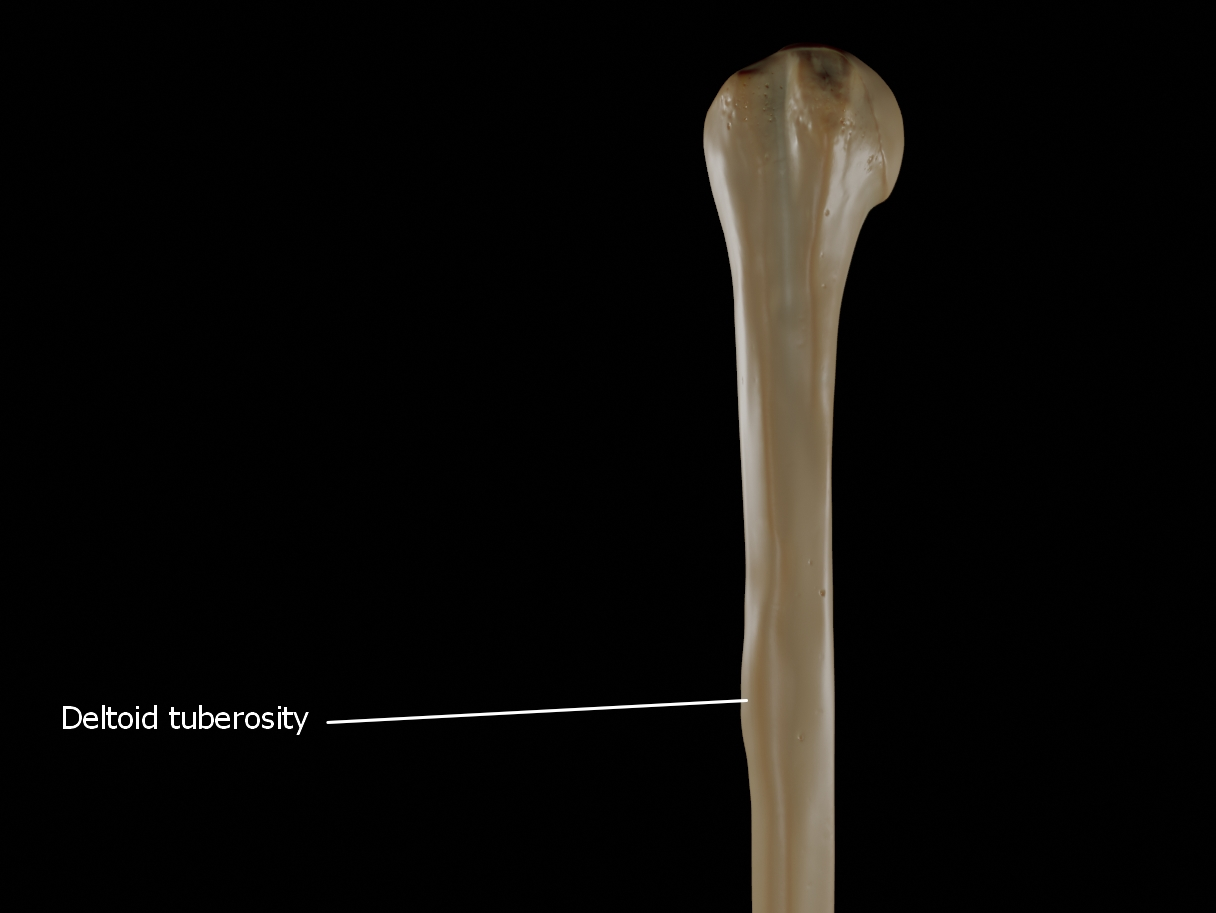
Deltoid tuberosity

=== Variation ===
The deltoid tuberosity has been reported as very prominent in less than 10% of people.

=== Development ===
The deltoid tuberosity develops through endochondral ossification in a two-phase process. The initiating signal is tendon-dependent, whilst the growth phase is muscle-dependent.

== Clinical significance ==
The deltoid tuberosity is at risk of avulsion fracture. These fractures may be managed conservatively with rest.

== Other animals ==
In mammals, the humerus displays a wide morphological variation. The size and orientation of its functionally important features, including the deltoid tubercle, greater tubercle, and medial epicondyle, are pivotal to an animal's style of locomotion and habitat. In cursorial (running) animals such as the pronghorn, the deltoid tubercle is located about a quarter of the way down the shaft, which allows for rapid but relatively weak limb flexion and extension. In natatorial (swimming) animals such as the North American river otter, the tubercle is located nearly halfway down the shaft, which allows for powerful limb flexion and extension. The tuberosity can be very pronounced in fossorial (digging) animals, such as the mountain beaver. It is very superficial in horses.

== See also ==
- Deltoid tubercle of spine of scapula
