= Neil E. Schore =

American chemist

- Born: March 6, 1948 (age 78); New Jersey, United States
- Education: University of Pennsylvania (BA); Columbia University (PhD)
- Scientific career
- Fields: Organometallic, polymer, and organic chemistry
- Doctoral advisor: Nicholas Turro
- Other academic advisors: Robert G. Bergman, Milt Yudis, Allan R. Day

Neil E. Schore is an American chemist and former associate professor of organic chemistry and Vice Chair of Chemistry at the University of California, Davis. He is also the co-author of Organic Chemistry: Structure and Function. His doctoral advisor at Columbia University was Nicholas Turro, a chemist in the field of organic photochemistry. His research areas include “mechanistic and synthetic organic and organometallic chemistry; applications of organometallic chemistry and polymer chemistry to organic synthesis.” He is now a professor emeritus at UC Davis and holds the position of adjunct professor at the Korea University International Summer Campus, teaching both general chemistry and organic chemistry.

== Honors, awards, and professional highlights ==
- 2019 Appointed as Professor Emeritus of Chemistry, UC Davis
- 2012 Appointed to faculty, Korea University International Summer Campus
- 2006 Phi Beta Kappa Award for Teaching Excellence
- 1999 Vice Chair of Chemistry, UC Davis
- 1999 Executive Secretary, UC Cancer Research Coordinating Committee
- 1989 Distinguished Teaching Award
- 1982 Became an associate professor, UC Davis
- 1981-1985 Dreyfus Teacher-Scholar
- 1979 Magnar Ronning Award, Teaching Excellence
- 1976 Appointed to faculty, UC Davis (Assistant Professor)
- 1974-1976 NIH Postdoctoral Fellowship
- 1973 Ph.D. Columbia University
- 1973 Louis P. Hammett Award
- 1969-1973 NSF and NIH Predoctoral fellowships
- 1969 B.A. University of Pennsylvania
