= 1,2-Bis(dicyanomethylene)squarate =

1,2-Bis(dicyanomethylene)squarate

1,2-Bis(dicyanomethylene)squarate is a divalent anion with chemical formula C_{10}N_{4}O^{2−}_{2} or ((N≡C−)_{2}C=)_{2}(C_{4}O_{2})^{2−}. It is one of the pseudo-oxocarbon anions, as it can be described as a derivative of the squarate oxocarbon anion C_{4}O^{2−}_{4} through the replacement of two adjacent oxygen atoms by dicyanomethylene groups =C(−C≡N)_{2}.

Nuclear magnetic resonance shows that the aromatic character of the squarate core is retained.

== Synthesis ==
The anion can be obtained by reacting squaric acid with n-butanol to obtain the diester 1,2-dibutyl squarate (an oily orange liquid) and treating the latter with metallic sodium and malononitrile (N≡C−)_{2}CH_{2} to give the trihydrated disodium salt 2Na^{+}·C_{10}N_{4}O^{2−}_{2}·3H_{2}O, a yellow water-soluble solid. The hydrated salt loses the water below 100 °C, but the resulting anhydrous salt is stable up to 400 °C.

== Salts ==
Reaction of the sodium salt with the chlorides of other cations in ethanol affords the following salts:

- dipotassium 2K^{+}·K_{2}C_{10}N_{4}O^{2−}_{2}, anhydrous, yellow, stable to 300 °C
- dirubidium 2Rb^{+}·Rb_{2}C_{10}N_{4}O^{2−}_{2}, anhydrous, brown, stable to 300 °C
- magnesium sodium chloride, Mg^{2+}·Na^{+}·Cl^{−}·C_{10}N_{4}O^{2−}_{2}·4 1/2H_{2}O, dark yellow, dehydrates at 60–106 °C, stable to 461 °C
- calcium disodium, 2Na^{+}·Ca^{2+}·2C_{10}N_{4}O^{2−}_{2}·9H_{2}O, yellow, dehydrates at 50–90 °C, stable to 178 °C
- barium, Ba^{2+}·C_{10}N_{4}O^{2−}_{2}·2H_{2}O, yellow, dehydrates at 87 °C, stable to 337 °C
- tetra-n-butylammonium, 2(C_{4}H_{5})_{4}N^{+}·C_{10}N_{4}O^{2−}_{2}·H_{2}O, yellow, dehydrates at 145 °C, stable to 323 °C

== See also ==
- Croconate violet
- Croconate blue
- 1,3-Bis(dicyanomethylene)squarate
