= Ethynol =

Structural formula of ethynol
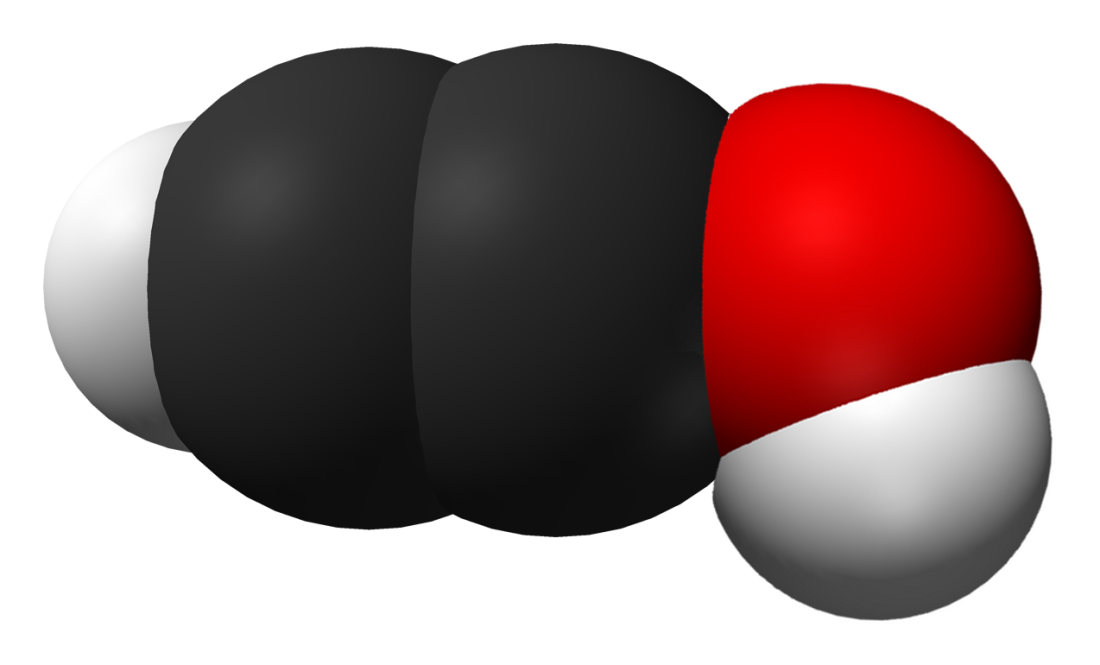
Spacefill model of ethynol

Names
- Systematic IUPAC name Ethynol
- Other names Ynol, ethynyl alcohol, hydroxyacetylene

Identifiers
| CAS Number | 32038-79-2 |
| 3D model (JSmol) | Interactive image; Interactive image |
| ChemSpider | 110037 |
| PubChem CID | 123441 |
| CompTox Dashboard (EPA) | DTXSID90185855 |
- InChI: InChI=1S/C2H2O/c1-2-3/h1,3H Key: QFXZANXYUCUTQH-UHFFFAOYSA-N
- SMILES: OC#C; C#CO

Properties
| Chemical formula | C_{2}H_{2}O |
| Molar mass | 42.037 g·mol^{−1} |
| Density | 0.981 g·cm^{−3} |
| Boiling point | 77.1 °C (170.8 °F; 350.2 K) @ 760mmHg |

Hazards
| Flash point | 14.7 °C (58.5 °F; 287.8 K) |

Thermochemistry
| Std enthalpy of formation (Δ_{f}H^{⦵}_{298}) | 41.6 kJ mol^{−1} |

Related compounds
| Related compounds | Propargyl alcohol |
- Except where otherwise noted, data are given for materials in their standard state (at 25 °C [77 °F], 100 kPa). verify (what is ?) Infobox references

Ethynol (or hydroxyacetylene, ethynyl alcohol) is an alkyne–alcohol (ynol) with the formula C_{2}H_{2}O or CHCOH. It is the much-less-stable tautomer of ethenone.

At low temperature in a solid argon matrix it is possible to tautomerise ethenone to form ethynol.

== See also ==
- Ethanol (ethyl alcohol)
- Ethenol (vinyl alcohol)
- Acetylenediol
