= 1,3-Bis(dicyanomethylene)squarate =

1,3-Bis(dicyanomethylene)squarate

1,3-Bis(dicyanomethylene)squarate is a divalent anion with chemical formula C_{10}N_{4}O^{2−}_{2} or ((N≡C−)_{2}C=)_{2}(C_{4}O_{2})^{2−}. It is one of the pseudo-oxocarbon anions, as it can be described as a derivative of the squarate oxocarbon anion C_{4}O^{2−}_{4} through the replacement of two opposite oxygen atoms by dicyanomethylene groups =C(−C≡N)_{2}.

The anion can be obtained by reacting squaric acid with aniline to form 1,3-dianiline squarate (a yellow solid), before treating the diester with malononitrile (N≡C−)_{2}CH_{2} and sodium ethoxide to give the disodium tetrahydrate salt 2Na^{+}·C_{10}N_{4}O^{2−}_{2}·4H_{2}O, an orange water-soluble solid. The hydrated salt loses the water below 100 °C, but the resulting anhydrous salt is stable up to 400 °C. Reaction of the sodium salt with salts of other cations in ethanol affords the following salts:

- dipotassium sodium chloride 2K^{+}·Na^{+}·Cl^{−}·K_{2}C_{10}N_{4}O^{2−}_{2}·1/2CH_{3}CN, orange
- rubidium sodium chloride 7Rb^{+}·Na^{+}·2Cl^{−}·3Rb_{2}C_{10}N_{4}O^{2−}_{2}·CH_{3}CH_{2}OH, orange, loses 1 ethanol at 96 °C, stable to 361 °C
- magnesium disodium nitrate, Mg^{2+}·2Na^{+}C_{10}N_{4}O^{2−}_{2}·NO^{−}_{3}·6H_{2}O·CH_{3}CH_{2}OH, orange, loses 1 ethanol and 6 H_{2}O at 78 °C, stable to 482 °C
- calcium, Ca^{2+}·C_{10}N_{4}O^{2−}_{2}·6H_{2}O, purple, dehydrates at 63–102 °C, stable to 468 °C
- barium, Ba^{2+}·C_{10}N_{4}O^{2−}_{2}·4H_{2}O, orange, dehydrates at 71–96 °C, stable to 457 °C
- tetra-n-butylammonium sodium, 2(C_{4}H_{9})_{4}N^{+}·2Na^{+}·2Cl^{−}·2C_{10}N_{4}O^{2−}_{2}·CH_{3}CH_{2}OH, orange, loses 1 ethanol and 2 tetrabutylammonium at 111 °C, stable to 238 °C

Nuclear magnetic resonance shows that the aromatic character of the squarate core is retained.

== See also ==
- Croconate violet
- Croconate blue
- 1,2-Bis(dicyanomethylene)squarate
