= Cyclopropenone =

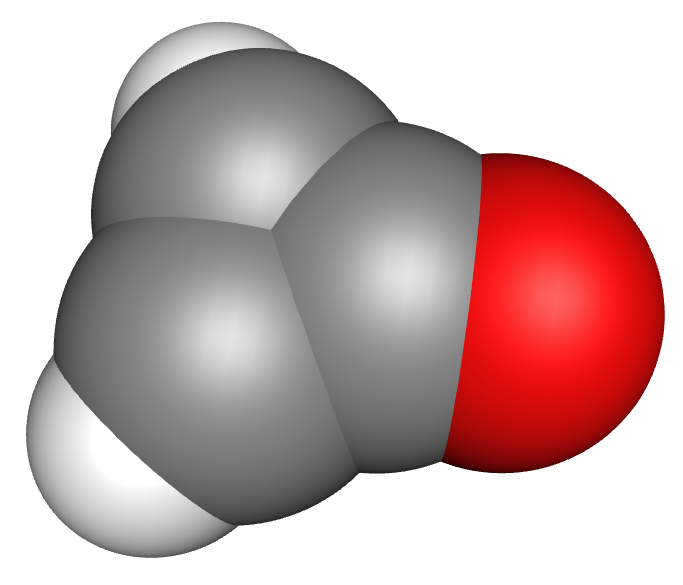

Names
- Preferred IUPAC name Cycloprop-2-en-1-one
- Other names Cyclopropenone, Cyclopropene-3-one

Identifiers
CAS Number	2961-80-0
3D model (JSmol)	Interactive image
ChemSpider	121433
PubChem CID	137779
UNII	5MPZ6QZ6ZF
CompTox Dashboard (EPA)	DTXSID50183796
- InChI: InChI=1S/C3H2O/c4-3-1-2-3/h1-2H Key: GGRQLKPIJPFWEZ-UHFFFAOYSA-N; InChI=1/C3H2O/c4-3-1-2-3/h1-2H Key: GGRQLKPIJPFWEZ-UHFFFAOYAI
- SMILES: c1cc1=O

Properties
Chemical formula	C_{3}H_{2}O
Molar mass	54.048 g·mol^{−1}
Appearance	Colorless liquid
Melting point	−29 to −28 °C (−20 to −18 °F; 244 to 245 K)
- Except where otherwise noted, data are given for materials in their standard state (at 25 °C [77 °F], 100 kPa). Infobox references

Cyclopropenone is an organic compound with molecular formula C_{3}H_{2}O consisting of a cyclopropene carbon framework with a ketone functional group. It is a colorless, volatile liquid that boils near room temperature. Neat cyclopropenone polymerizes upon standing at room temperature, and chemical vendors typically supply it as an acetal. The chemical properties of the compound are dominated by the strong polarization of the carbonyl group, which gives a partial positive charge with aromatic stabilization on the ring and a partial negative charge on oxygen.

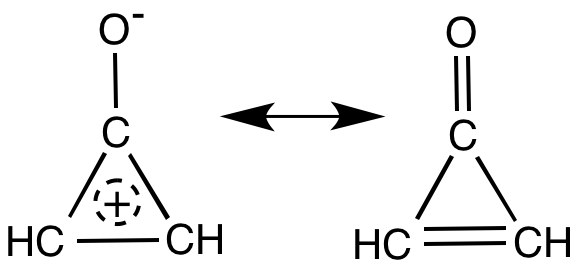
Main resonance structures of cyclopropenone

Cyclopropenone has been observed in the gas phase in interstellar environments such as the Taurus molecular cloud.

== See also ==
- Diphenylcyclopropenone
- Deltic acid
- Tropone
