= Deltic acid =

- Structural formula

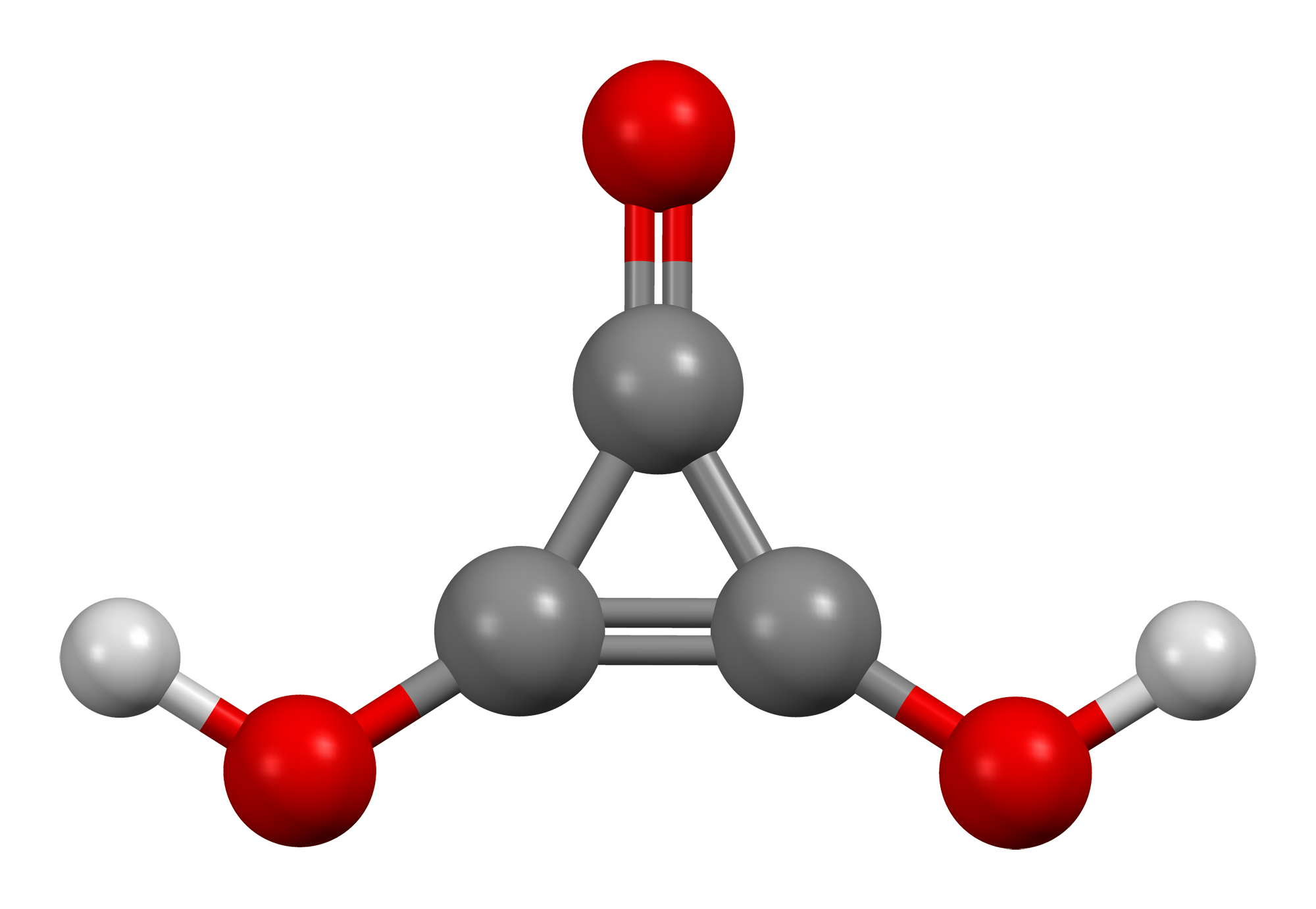
- Ball and stick model

Names
- Preferred IUPAC name 2,3-Dihydroxycycloprop-2-en-1-one
- Other names: Deltic acid; Dihydroxycyclopropenone; Trianglic acid

Identifiers
CAS Number	54826-91-4
3D model (JSmol)	Interactive image
ChemSpider	9854518
PubChem CID	11679790
UNII	EQ4CJ53JF9
CompTox Dashboard (EPA)	DTXSID40470465
- InChI: InChI=1/C3H2O3/c4-1-2(5)3(1)6/h4-5H Key: SPXGBDTUWODGLI-UHFFFAOYAW
- SMILES: O=C1C(O)=C1O

Properties
Chemical formula	C_{3}H_{2}O_{3}
Molar mass	86.046 g·mol^{−1}
Appearance	White solid
- Except where otherwise noted, data are given for materials in their standard state (at 25 °C [77 °F], 100 kPa). Infobox references

Deltic acid (also known as dihydroxycyclopropenone or trianglic acid) is a chemical substance with the chemical formula C_{3}O(OH)_{2}. It can be viewed as a ketone and double enol of cyclopropene. At room temperature, it is a stable white solid, soluble in diethyl ether, that decomposes (sometimes explosively) between 140 °C and 180 °C, and reacts slowly with water.

== Derivatives ==
=== Deltate and salts ===
Deltic acid is considered an acid because it is a particularly acidic enediol, with hydroxyl groups relatively easily losing their protons (pK_{a1} = 2.57, pK_{a2} = 6.03), leaving behind the symmetric deltate anion, C_{3}O^{2−}_{3}.

The first deltate salts (of lithium and potassium) were described in 1976, also by Eggerding and West. Lithium deltate Li_{2}C_{3}O_{3} is a water-soluble white solid. Like the other cyclic dianions with formula (CO)^{2−}_{n}, the deltate anion has a pronounced aromatic character which contributes to its relative stability.

=== Analogs ===
An analog of the deltate anion can be obtained by replacing the three oxygen atoms (=O or −O^{−}) by cyanoimino groups (=N−C≡N or −N=C=N^{−}) to yield the symmetric anion C_{3}(NCN)^{2−}_{3}. Replacement of the three oxygen atoms by dicyanomethylene (=C(CN)_{2}) provides an oxidizing species that is readily reduced to a stable radical anion and dianion.

== Synthesis ==
Deltic acid was originally obtained by photolysis of the ester bis(trimethylsilyl) squarate, which converted into bis(trimethylsilyl) derivative. Upon irradiation with UV light, the disilyl compound decarbonylates. Decomposition of the latter by butanol yielded deltic acid.

The acid can also be prepared by reaction of silver squarate and trimethylsilyl chloride.

The deltate anion has also been obtained by direct cyclotrimerization of carbon monoxide at ambient conditions. Carbon monoxide dissolved in pentane reacted with a uranium coordination compound yielding a deltate anion bound to two uranium atoms.

== See also ==
- Acetylenediol (H_{2}(CO)_{2} or HO−C≡C−OH)
- Squaric acid (H_{2}(CO)_{4})
- Croconic acid (H_{2}(CO)_{5})
- Rhodizonic acid (H_{2}(CO)_{6})
- Cyclopropenone (C_{3}H_{2}O)
