= Croconic acid =

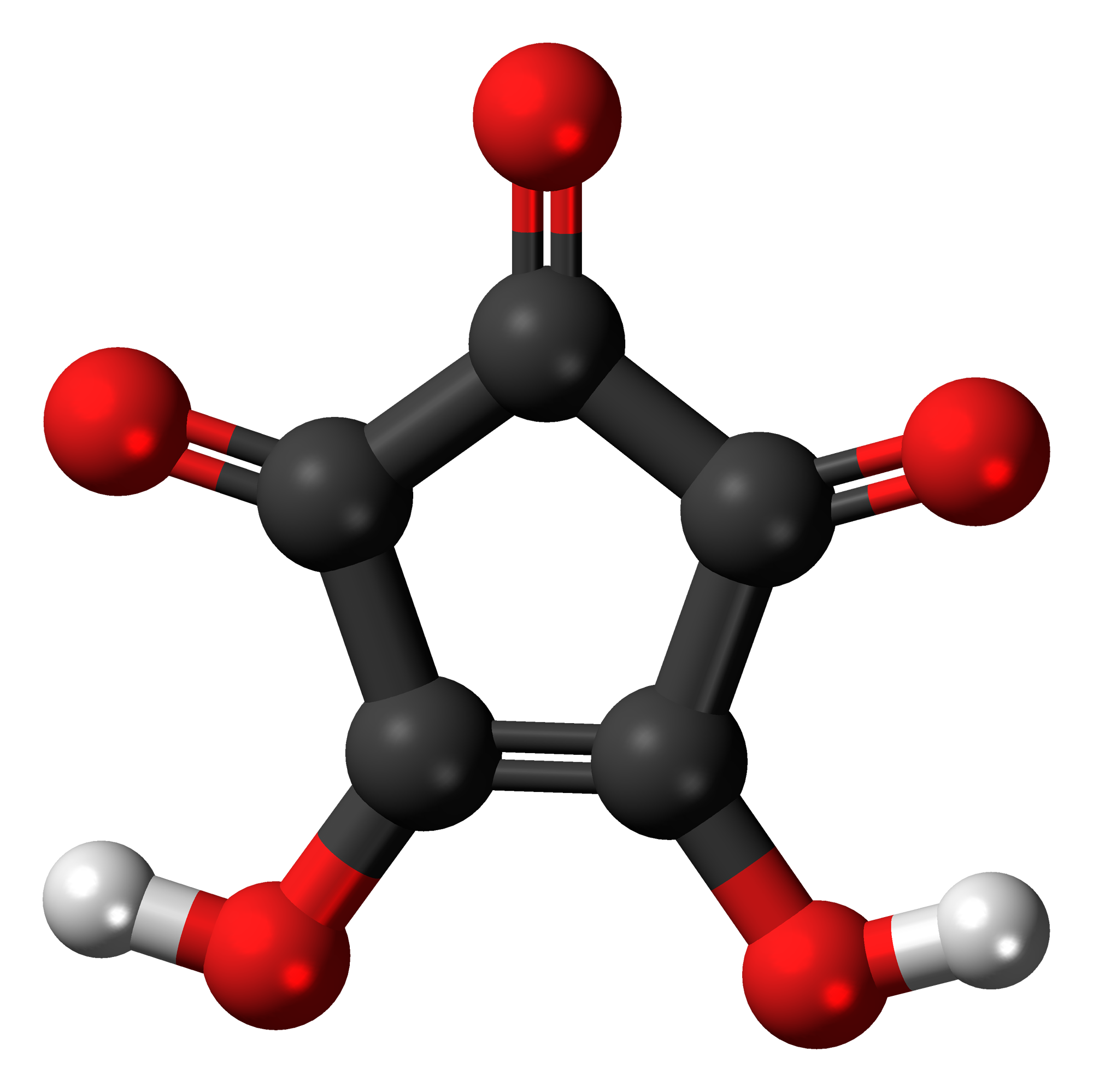

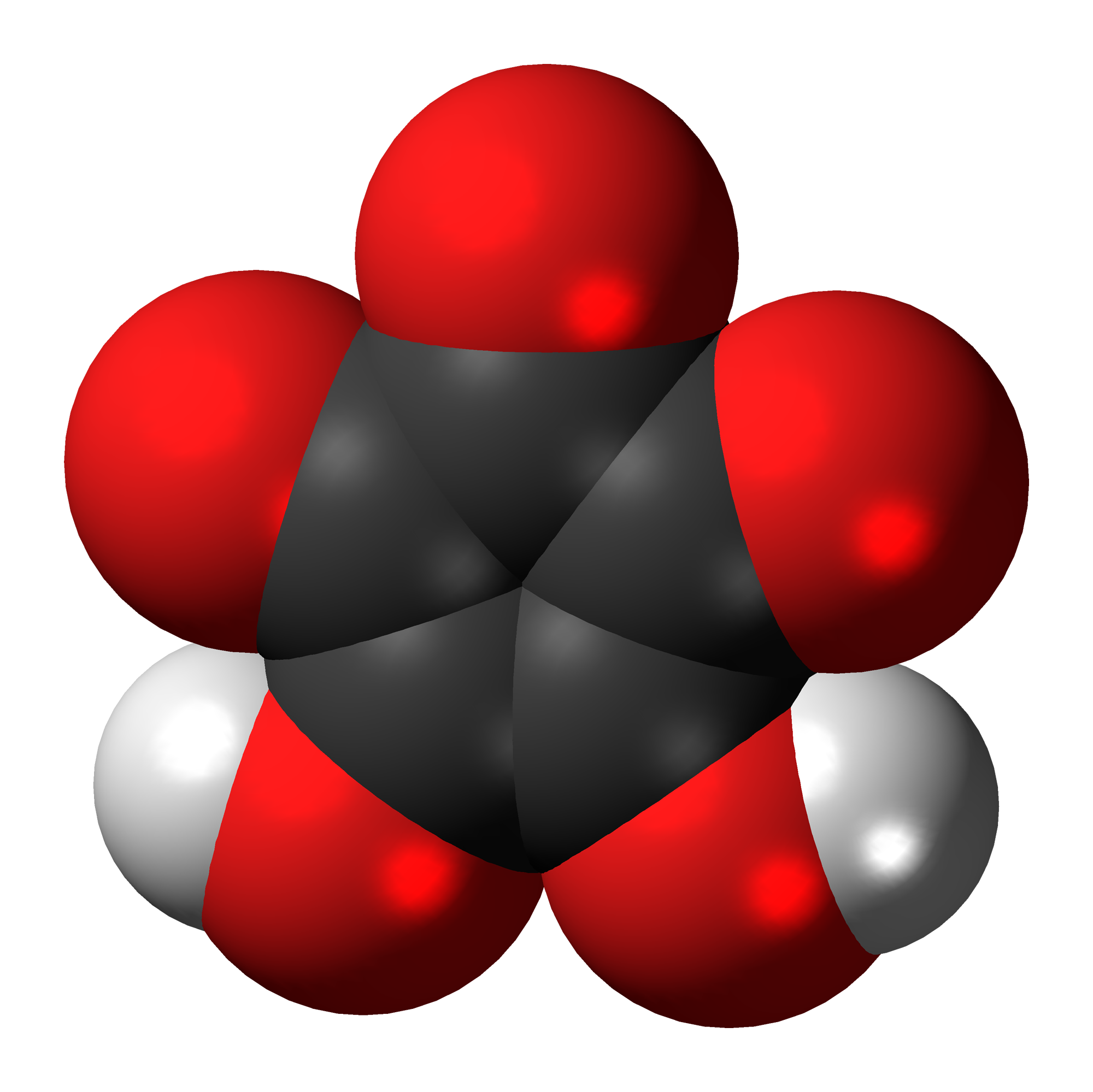

Names
- Preferred IUPAC name 4,5-Dihydroxycyclopent-4-ene-1,2,3-trione
- Other names Crocic acid

Identifiers
CAS Number	488-86-8
3D model (JSmol)	Interactive image
ChemSpider	476003
ECHA InfoCard	100.201.686
PubChem CID	546874
UNII	6HGY35UXAA
CompTox Dashboard (EPA)	DTXSID20878763
- InChI: InChI=1S/C5H2O5/c6-1-2(7)4(9)5(10)3(1)8/h6-7H Key: RBSLJAJQOVYTRQ-UHFFFAOYSA-N
- SMILES: O=C1C(O)=C(O)C(=O)C1=O

Properties
Chemical formula	C_{5}H_{2}O_{5}
Molar mass	142.066 g·mol^{−1}
Melting point	> 300 °C (572 °F; 573 K) (decomposes)
Acidity (pK_{a})	0.80, 2.24
- Except where otherwise noted, data are given for materials in their standard state (at 25 °C [77 °F], 100 kPa). Infobox references

Croconic acid (also known as 4,5-dihydroxycyclopentenetrione, crocic acid or pentagonic acid) is a chemical compound with formula C_{5}H_{2}O_{5} or (C=O)_{3}(COH)_{2}. It has a cyclopentene backbone with two hydroxyl groups adjacent to the double bond and three ketone groups on the remaining carbon atoms. It is sensitive to light, soluble in water and ethanol and forms yellow crystals that decompose at 212 °C.

The compound is acidic and loses the protons from the hydroxyl groups (pK_{a1} = 0.80±0.08 and pK_{a2} = 2.24±0.01 at 25 °C). The resulting anions, hydrogencroconate C_{5}HO^{−}_{5} and croconate C_{5}O^{2−}_{5} are also quite stable. The croconate ion, in particular, is aromatic and symmetric, as the double bond and the negative charges become delocalized over the five CO units (with two electrons, Hückel's rule means this is an aromatic configuration). The lithium, sodium and potassium croconates crystallize from water as dihydrates but the orange potassium salt can be dehydrated to form a monohydrate. The croconates of ammonium, rubidium and caesium crystallize in the anhydrous form. Salts of barium, lead, silver, copper, iron, zinc, nickel, manganese, cobalt, aluminium, and chromium are also known.

Croconic acid also forms ethers such as dimethyl croconate where the hydrogen atom of the hydroxyl group is substituted with an alkyl group.

== History ==
Croconic acid and potassium croconate dihydrate were discovered by Leopold Gmelin in 1825, who named the compounds from Greek κρόκος meaning "crocus" or "egg yolk". The structure of ammonium croconate was determined by Baenziger et al. in 1964. The structure of K_{2}C_{5}O_{5}·2H_{2}O was determined by Dunitz in 2001.

== Structure ==
In the solid state, croconic acid has a peculiar structure consisting of pleated strips, each "page" of the strip being a planar ring of 4 molecules of C_{5}O_{5}H_{2} held together by hydrogen bonds. In dioxane it has a large dipole moment of 9–10 D, while the free molecule is estimated to have a dipole of 7–7.5 D. The solid is ferroelectric with a Curie point above 400 K (127 °C), indeed the organic crystal with the highest spontaneous polarization (about 20 μC/cm^{2}). This is due to proton transfer between adjacent molecules in each pleated sheet, rather than molecular rotation.

In the solid alkali metal salts, the croconate anions and the alkali cations form parallel columns. In the mixed salt K_{3}(HC_{5}O_{5})(C_{5}O_{5})·2H_{2}O, which formally contains both one croconate dianion C_{5}O^{2−}_{5} and one hydrogencroconate monoanion (HC_{5}O^{−}_{5}), the hydrogen is shared equally by two adjacent croconate units.

Salts of the croconate anion and its derivatives are of interest in supramolecular chemistry research because of their potential for π-stacking effects, where the delocalized electrons of two stacked croconate anions interact.

Infrared and Raman assignments indicate that the equalization of the carbon–carbon bond lengths, thus the electronic delocalization, follows with an increase in counter-ion size for salts. This result leads to a further interpretation that the degree of aromaticity is enhanced for salts as a function of the size of the counter-ion. The same study provided quantum mechanical DFT calculations for the optimized structures and vibrational spectra which were in agreement with experimental findings. The values for calculated theoretical indices of aromaticity also increased with counterion size.

The croconate anion forms hydrated crystalline coordination compounds with divalent cations of transition metals, with general formula M(C_{5}O_{5})·3H_{2}O; where M stands for copper (yielding a brown solid), iron (dark purple), zinc (yellow), nickel (green), manganese (dark green), or cobalt (purple). These complexes all have the same orthorhombic crystal structure, consisting of chains of alternating croconate and metal ions. Each croconate is bound to the preceding metal by one oxygen atom, and to the next metal through its two opposite oxygens, leaving two oxygens unbound. Each metal is bound to three croconate oxygens and to one water molecule. Calcium also forms a compound with the same formula (yellow) but the structure appears to be different.

Croconate dianion

The croconate anion also forms compounds with trivalent cations such as aluminium (yellow), chromium (brown), and iron (purple). These compounds also include hydroxyl groups as well as hydration water and have a more complicated crystal structure. No indication was found of sandwich-type bonds between the delocalized electrons and the metal (as are seen in ferrocene, for example), but the anion can form metal complexes with a large variety of bonding patterns, involving from only one to all five of its oxygen atoms.

== See also ==
- Croconate violet
- Croconate blue
- Rhodizonic acid
- Squaric acid
- Deltic acid
- Cyclopentanepentone (leuconic acid)
