= Diphenylcyclopropenone =

Names
- Preferred IUPAC name 2,3-Diphenylcycloprop-2-en-1-one
- Other names Diphencyprone, DPCP, DPC

Identifiers
CAS Number	886-38-4
3D model (JSmol)	Interactive image
ChemSpider	58568
ECHA InfoCard	100.011.772
PubChem CID	65057
UNII	I7G14NW5EC
CompTox Dashboard (EPA)	DTXSID2046545
- InChI: InChI=1S/C15H10O/c16-15-13(11-7-3-1-4-8-11)14(15)12-9-5-2-6-10-12/h1-10H
- SMILES: O=C2C(=C2\c1ccccc1)\c3ccccc3

Properties
Chemical formula	C_{15}H_{10}O
Molar mass	206.244 g·mol^{−1}
- Except where otherwise noted, data are given for materials in their standard state (at 25 °C [77 °F], 100 kPa). Infobox references

Diphenylcyclopropenone (diphencyprone) is a topically administered experimental drug intended for treating alopecia areata and alopecia totalis. Topical immunotherapy using diphenylcyclopropenone may also be an effective treatment option for recalcitrant warts. It is not approved by either the Food and Drug Administration or the European Medicines Agency.

== Mechanism of action ==
Diphenylcyclopropenone triggers an immune response that is thought to oppose the action of the autoreactive cells that otherwise cause hair loss. One hypothesis is that in response to DPCP treatment, the body will attempt to downregulate inflammation through a variety of pathways, resulting in a downregulation of the autoimmune response at the hair follicle. This autoinflammatory reaction would otherwise destroy body's hair follicles.

== Studies ==
A study of 41 alopecia areata patients showed significant hair regrowth in 40% at 6 months, being sustained in two thirds of these after a 12-month-follow up-period.

In a 2002 study for the treatment of warts, the responders consisted of 135 individuals (87.7%) that had complete clearance of warts. Reported adverse effects were local and included with pruritus (itching) (15.6%), with blistering (7.1%), and with eczematous reactions (eczema)(14.2%). The majority of the patients tolerated the treatment very well. One patient developed local impetigo (minor infection). Patients had an average of 5 treatments over a 6-month period.

== Chemical properties ==
The chemical properties of diphenylcyclopropenone are dominated by the strong polarization of the carbonyl group, which gives a partial positive charge with aromatic stabilization on the cyclopropene (cyclopropenium) ring and a partial negative charge on oxygen. The steric hindrance and partial charge on the cyclopropenium inhibit further electrophilic aromatic substitution there, but the phenyl rings are reactive. The cyclopropenium acts as a meta director.

Electrophilic Lewis acids stabilize the charge separation, forming diphenylcyclopropenium ether or ester salts. Such compounds are extremely reactive electrophiles.

Conversely, the oxygen is quite nucleophilic. Lux-Flood acids can abstract the oxygen: thus activated isocyanates effect imines; phosphorus sulfides or activated thioic acids effect the thione, and a wide variety of electrophilic chlorinators, including oxalyl chloride, thionyl chloride, and phosphorus pentachloride, effect 3,3‑dichloro-1,2‑diphenylcyclopropene. The latter sees primary application as an electrophilic chlorinator itself, and catalyzes the action of the aforementioned chlorinators.

3,3‑Dichloro-1,2‑diphenylcyclopropene also ligates palladium for cross-coupling reactions, and reacts with trichloroacetate to give diphenylcyclobutenedione upon aqueous workup.

In other respects, the carbonyl is a typical electrophile, adding Grignard reagents, Knoevenagel enols, and enamines. The central ring is highly strained, and the presence of most transition metals or heating to 160 °C induces decarbonylation, although heating just below the decarbonylation temperature (150 °C) irreversibly forms a [3+2] dimer instead. Soft nucleophiles that typically add in conjugate will open the ring, as do naïve reductions. However, careful hydroboration can reduce away the carbonyl.

== See also ==
- Benzophenone
- Cyclopropenone
