= Moniliformin =

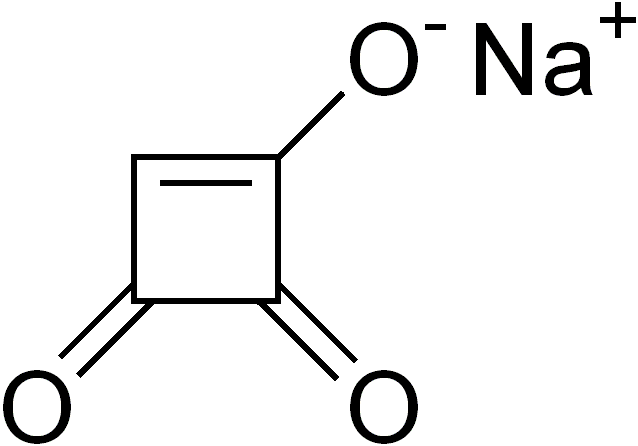

Names
- IUPAC name Sodium 3,4-dioxo-1-cyclobuten-1-olate
- Other names: 3-Hydroxycyclobut-3-ene-1,2-dione sodium salt; Moniliformin; Semisquaric acid sodium salt; Sodium semisquarate

Identifiers
CAS Number	31876-38-7
3D model (JSmol)	Interactive image
ChemSpider	36957
PubChem CID	40452
UNII	G5JMQ8SDF8
CompTox Dashboard (EPA)	DTXSID10185731
- InChI: InChI=1S/C4H2O3/c5-2-1-3(6)4(2)7/h1,5H Key: KGPQKNJSZNXOPV-UHFFFAOYSA-N; InChI=1/C4H2O3/c5-2-1-3(6)4(2)7/h1,5H Key: KGPQKNJSZNXOPV-UHFFFAOYAJ
- SMILES: O=C1C(\O)=C/C1=O

Properties
Chemical formula	NaC_{4}HO_{3}
Molar mass	120.039 g·mol^{−1}
Appearance	Yellow crystalline solid
Melting point	Decomposes at 345-355 °C without melting
Solubility in water	very good

Related compounds
Related compounds	Squaric acid
- Except where otherwise noted, data are given for materials in their standard state (at 25 °C [77 °F], 100 kPa). verify (what is ?) Infobox references

Moniliformin is the organic compound with the formula M[C_{4}HO_{3}] (M^{+} = K^{+} or Na^{+}). Both the sodium and potassium salts are generally hydrated, e.g. . In terms of its structure, it is the alkali metal salt of the conjugate base of 3-hydroxy-1,2-cyclobutenedione (the enolate of 1,2,3-cyclobutanetrione), a planar molecule related to squaric acid. It is an unusual mycotoxin, a feed contaminant that is lethal to fowl, especially ducklings.

Moniliformin is formed in many cereals by a number of Fusarium species that include Fusarium moniliforme, Fusarium avenaceum, Fusarium subglutinans, Fusarium proliferatum, Fusarium fujikuroi and others. It is mainly cardiotoxic and causes ventricular hypertrophy.

== Biochemistry ==
Moniliformin actually causes competitive inhibition of the activity of pyruvate dehydrogenase complex of respiratory reaction, which prevents pyruvic acid, product of glycolysis, to convert to acetyl-CoA. Ultrastructural examination of right ventricular wall of 9 month old female mink (Mustela vison) fed acute doses of moniliformin (2.2 and 2.8 mg/kg diet) and sub-acute doses (1.5 to 3.2 mg/kg diet) reveals significant damage to myofiber, mitochondria, Z and M lines and sarcoplasmic reticulum as well as increased extracellular collagen deposition. Minks are considered most sensitive mammals to the toxicity of moniliformin. Chemically speaking, it is the sodium salt of deoxysquaric acid (the other name of that acid is semisquaric acid).

== Physicochemical information ==
Moniliformin is soluble in water and polar solvents, such as methanol.

λ_{max}: 226 nm and 259 nm in methanol.

== See also ==
- Mycotoxin
- Squaric acid
