= Deltoid tubercle of spine of scapula =

Deltoid tubercle (of spine of scapula)
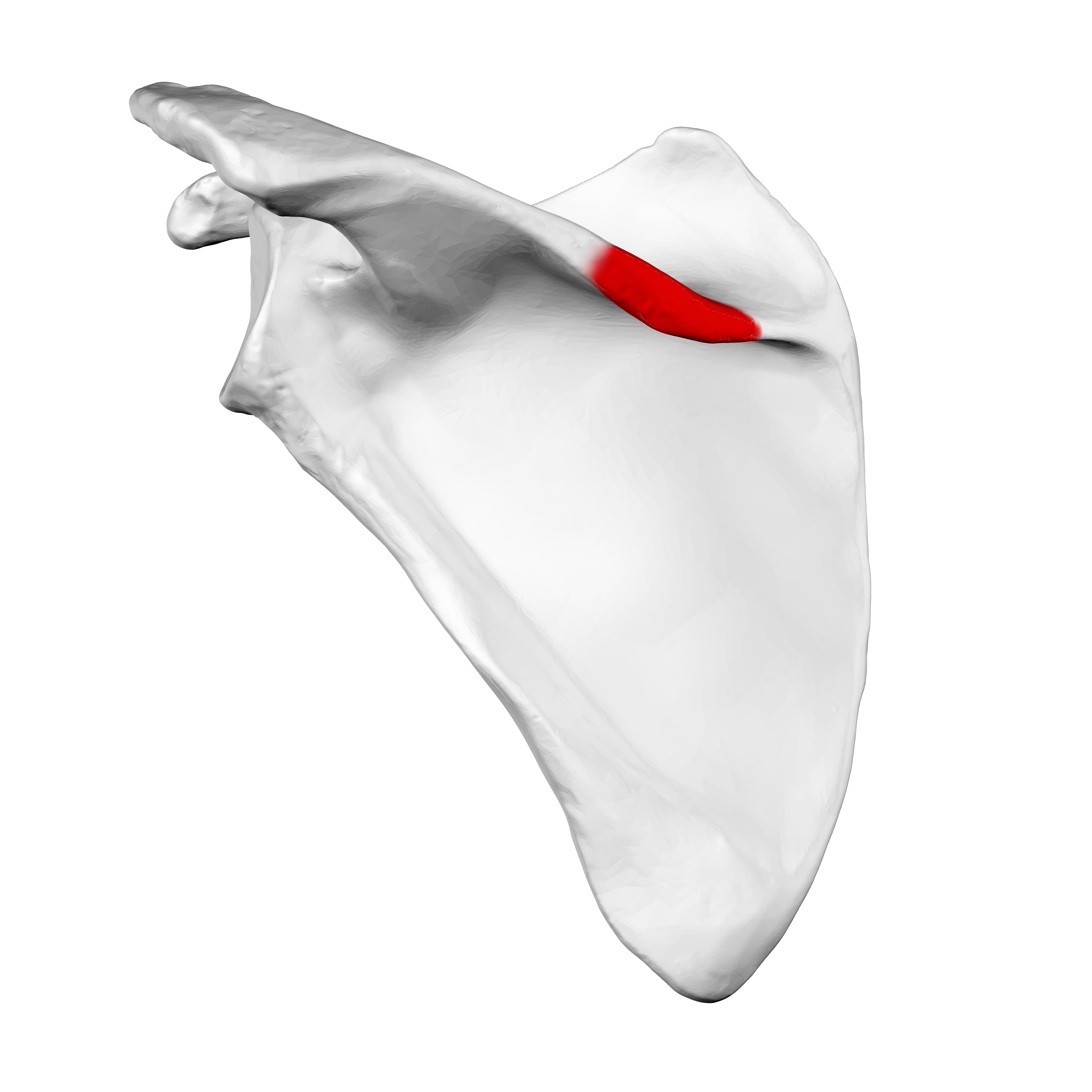
- Left scapula. Posterior view. Deltoid tubercle shown in red.

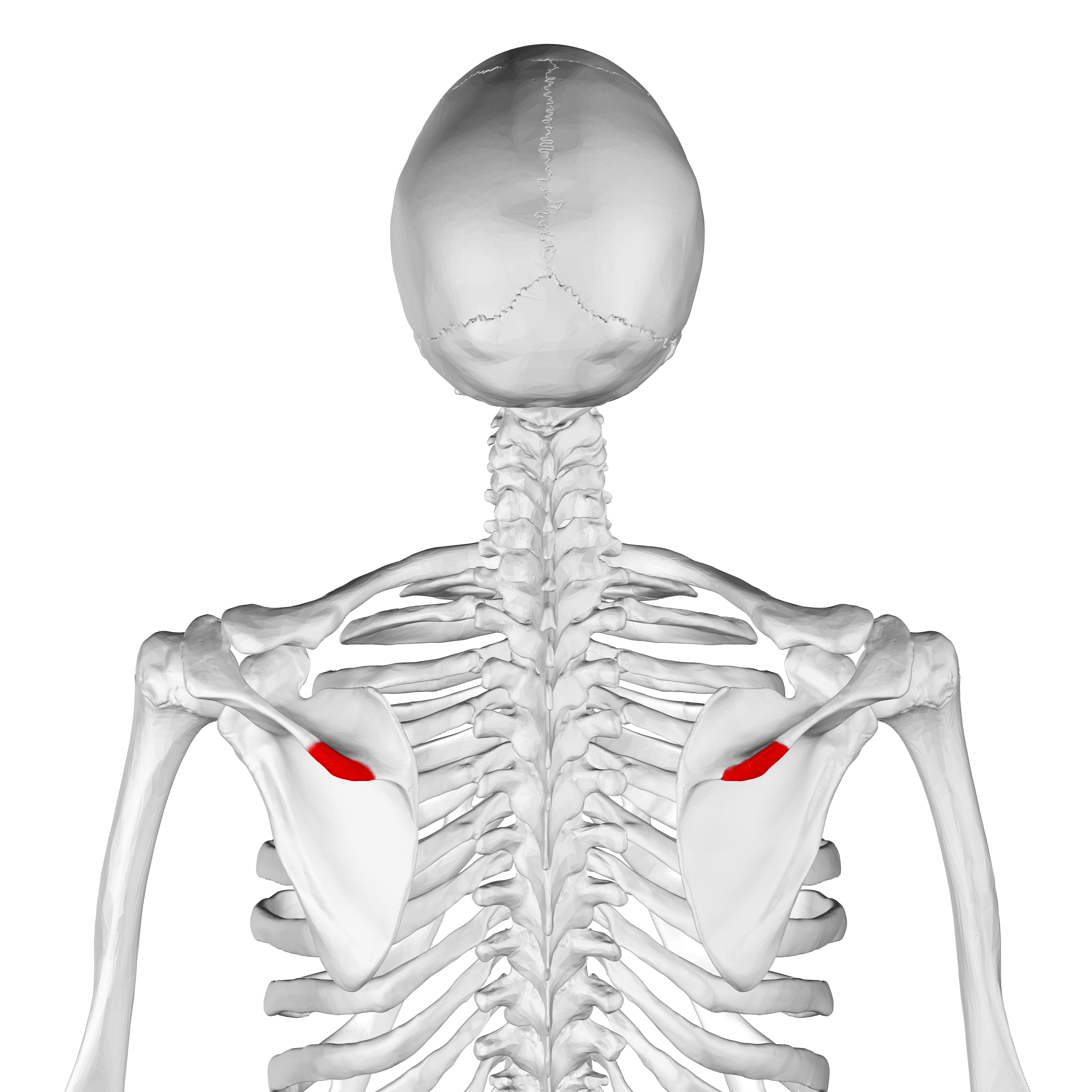
- Posterior view. Deltoid tubercle shown in red.

Details

Identifiers
- Latin: tuberculum deltoideum (spinae scapulae)
- TA98: A02.4.01.006
- TA2: 1148
- FMA: 23278

The deltoid tubercle of spine of scapula is a prominence on the spine of scapula. The spine, at lateral to the root of the spine, curves down and laterally to form a lip. This lip is called the deltoid tubercle.

== Muscles ==
Middle and inferior fibres of trapezius muscle, and deltoid muscle, attached to the deltoid tubercle. The deltoid tubercle marks the beginning of attachment of deltoid muscle.

== Additional images ==
Left scapula. Animation. Deltoid tubercle is shown in red.

Position of deltoid tubercle (shown in red). Animation.

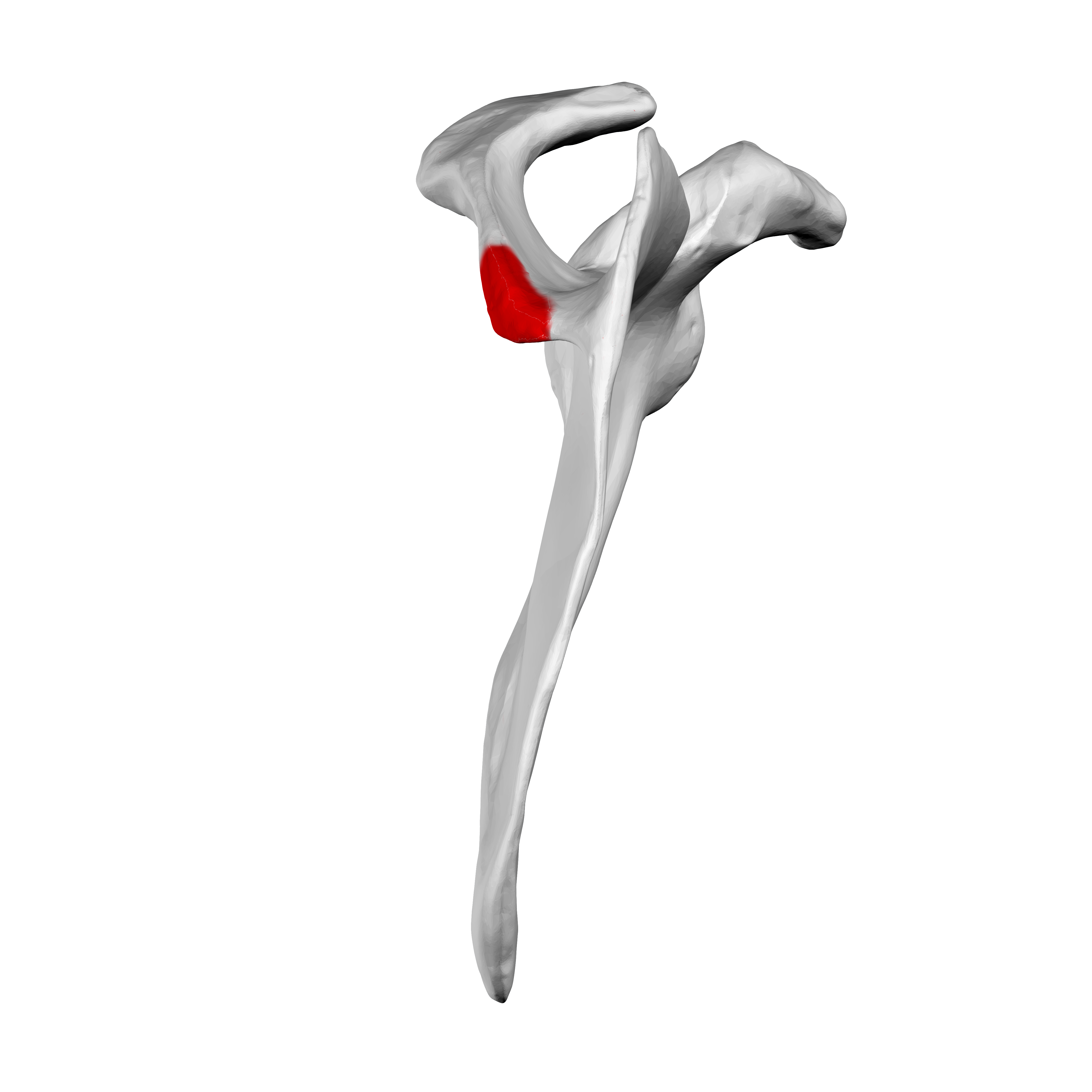
Medial view of left scapula. Deltoid tubercle shown in red.

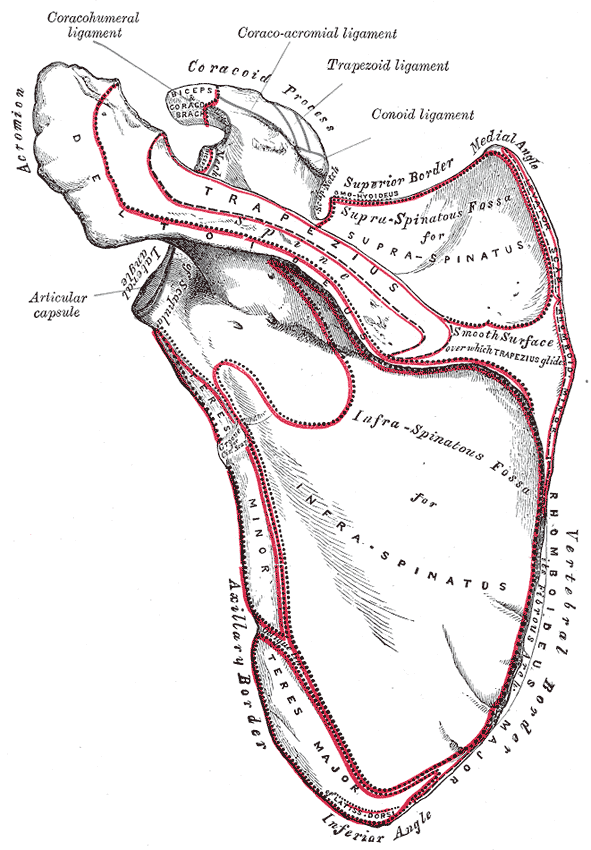
Posterior surface of scapula. Deltoid tubercle is not labeled but visible at center.

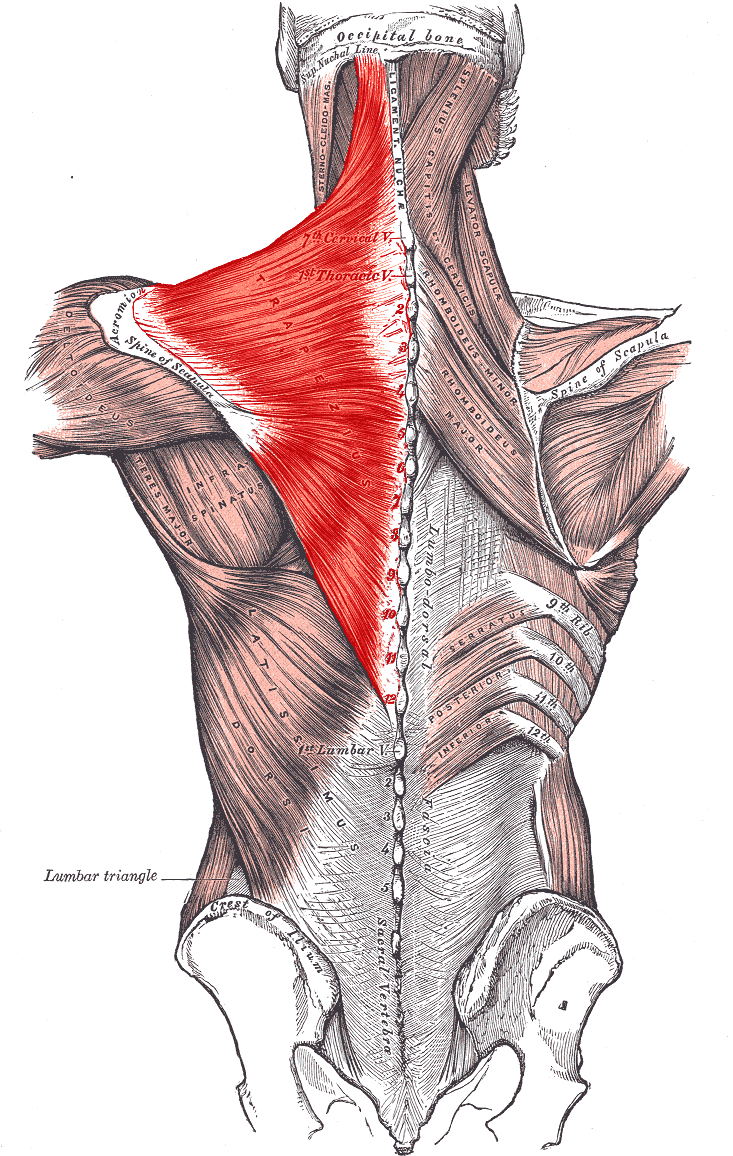
Trapezius muscle. Posterior view.

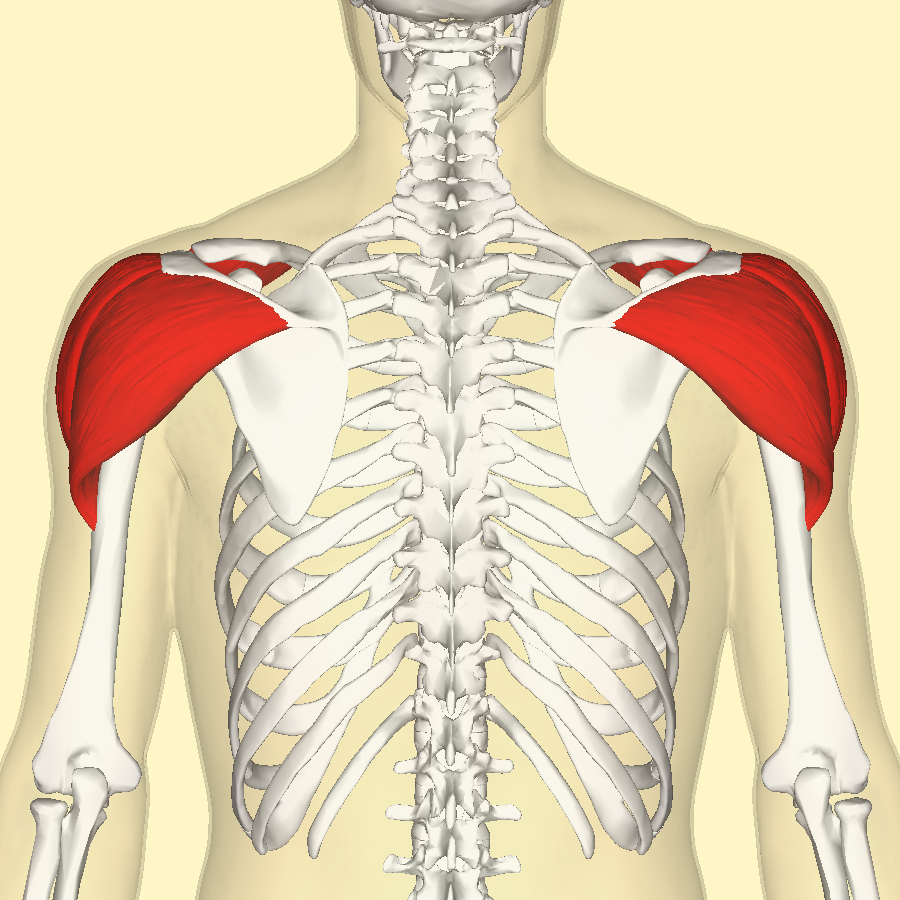
Deltoid muscle. Posterior view.

== See also ==
- Acromion
- Spine of scapula
