= Deltoid =

Deltoid (delta-shaped) can refer to:

- The deltoid muscle, a muscle in the shoulder
- Kite (geometry), also known as a deltoid, a type of quadrilateral
- A deltoid curve, a three-cusped hypocycloid
- A leaf shape
- The deltoid tuberosity, a part of the humerus
- The deltoid ligament, a ligament in the ankle

== See also ==
- Delta (disambiguation)
- The Deltoid Pumpkin Seed (1973), a book by John McPhee
