= Alexander J. Fatiadi =

American chemist

Alexander Johann Fatiadi (October 22, 1922 – September 16, 2010) was a chemist.

He obtained his masters from George Washington University, Washington DC (1957). He has worked at the National Bureau of Standards.

== Selected publications ==
- A. J. Fatiadi and W. F. Sanger (1962), Tetrahydroxyquinone. Organic Syntheses, Coll. Vol. 5, p. 1011 (1973); Vol. 42, p. 90 (1962)
- Alexander J. Fatiadi, Horace S. Isbell, William F. Sager (1963), Cyclic Polyhydroxy Ketones. I. Oxidation Products of Hexahydroxybenzene (Benzenehexol). Journal of Research of the National Bureau of Standards A: Physics and Chemistry, volume 67A, issue 2, pages 153–162. Online version
- A. J. Fatiadi and W. F. Sager (1973), Hexahydroxybenzene [Benzenehexol] Organic Syntheses, Coll. Vol. 5, p. 595
- Alexander J. Fatiadi (), Dielectric constant of n-hexane as a function of temperature, pressure, and density. NBS special publication, Issue 308, Page 175
- Alexander J. Fatiadi (1978), Synthesis of 1,3-(dicyanomethylene)croconate salts. New bond-delocalized dianion, "Croconate Violet". Journal of the American Chemical Society, volume 100 issue 8, pages 2586–2587. doi:10.1021/ja00476a073
- Alexander J. Fatiadi (1980), Pseudooxocarbons. Synthesis of 1,2,3-tris(dicyanomethylene)croconate salts. A new bond-delocalized dianion, croconate blue. Journal of Organic Chemistry volume 45, pages 1338–1339. doi:10.1021/jo01295a044
- Lawrence M. Doane, Alexander J. Fatiadi (1981), Electrochemical Oxidation of Croconate Salts; Evidence of the Chemical Equivalence of the Carbonyl Oxygen Atom and the Dicyanomethylene Group Communication, Angewandte Chemie International Edition in English, Volume 21 Issue 8, Pages 635 - 636 doi:10.1002/anie.198206351
- A. Fatiadi (1987), The Classical Permanganate Ion: Still a Novel Oxidant in Organic Chemistry. Synthesis, volume 1987, issue 2, pages 85–127 doi:10.1055/s-1987-27859
