= Underwater diving =

Descending below the surface of the water to interact with the environment

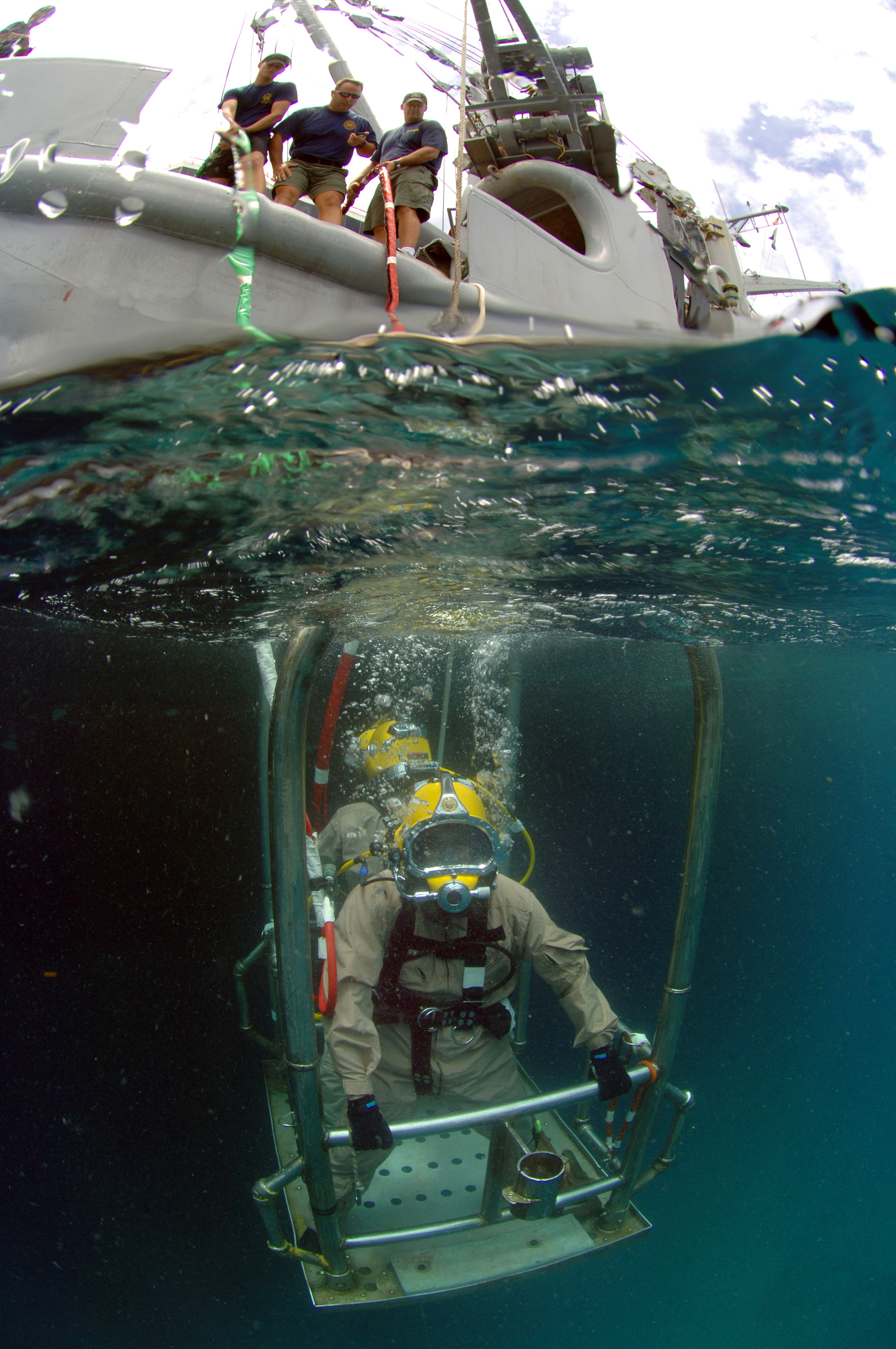
Surface-supplied divers riding a stage to the underwater workplace

Underwater diving, as a human activity, is the practice of descending below the water's surface to interact with the environment. It is also often referred to as diving, an ambiguous term with several possible meanings, depending on context. Immersion in water and exposure to high ambient pressure have physiological effects that limit the depths and duration possible in ambient pressure diving. Humans are not physiologically and anatomically well-adapted to the environmental conditions of diving, and various equipment has been developed to extend the depth and duration of human dives, and allow different types of work to be done.

In ambient pressure diving, the diver is directly exposed to the pressure of the surrounding water. The ambient pressure diver may dive on breath-hold (freediving) or use breathing apparatus for scuba diving or surface-supplied diving, and the saturation diving technique reduces the risk of decompression sickness (DCS) after long-duration deep dives. Atmospheric diving suits (ADS) may be used to isolate the diver from high ambient pressure. Crewed submersibles can extend depth range to full ocean depth, and remotely controlled or robotic machines can reduce risk to humans.

The environment exposes the diver to a wide range of hazards, and though the risks are largely controlled by appropriate diving skills, training, types of equipment and breathing gases used depending on the mode, depth and purpose of diving, it remains a relatively dangerous activity. Professional diving is usually regulated by occupational health and safety legislation, while recreational diving may be entirely unregulated. Diving activities are restricted to maximum depths of about 40 metres (130 ft) for recreational scuba diving, 530 metres (1,740 ft) for commercial saturation diving, and 610 metres (2,000 ft) wearing atmospheric suits. Diving is also restricted to conditions which are not excessively hazardous, though the level of risk acceptable can vary, and fatal incidents may occur.

Recreational diving (sometimes called sport diving or subaquatics) is a popular leisure activity. Technical diving is a form of recreational diving under more challenging conditions. Professional diving (commercial diving, diving for research purposes, or for financial gain) involves working underwater. Public safety diving is the underwater work done by law enforcement, fire rescue, and underwater search and recovery dive teams. Military diving includes combat diving, clearance diving and ships husbandry. Deep sea diving is underwater diving, usually with surface-supplied equipment, and often refers to the use of standard diving dress with the traditional copper helmet. Hard hat diving is any form of diving with a helmet, including the standard copper helmet, and other forms of free-flow and lightweight demand helmets. The history of breath-hold diving goes back at least to classical times, and there is evidence of prehistoric hunting and gathering of seafoods that may have involved underwater swimming. Technical advances allowing the provision of breathing gas to a diver underwater at ambient pressure are recent, and self-contained breathing systems developed at an accelerated rate following the Second World War.

== Physiological effects of ambient pressure diving ==
Immersion in water and exposure to cold water and high pressure have physiological effects on the diver which limit the depths and duration possible in ambient pressure diving. Breath-hold endurance is a severe limitation, and breathing at high ambient pressure adds further complications, both directly and indirectly. Technological solutions have been developed which can greatly extend depth and duration of human ambient pressure dives, and allow useful work to be done underwater.

As of 2009, there was no clear evidence that diving causes long term neurological dysfunction except by acute damage.

=== Immersion ===
Immersion of the human body in water affects the circulation, renal system, fluid balance, and breathing, because the external hydrostatic pressure of the water provides support against the internal hydrostatic pressure of the blood. This causes a blood shift from the extravascular tissues of the limbs into the chest cavity, and fluid losses known as immersion diuresis compensate for the blood shift in hydrated subjects soon after immersion. Hydrostatic pressure on the body from head-out immersion causes negative pressure breathing which contributes to the blood shift.

The blood shift causes an increased respiratory and cardiac workload. Stroke volume is not greatly affected by immersion or variation in ambient pressure, but slowed heartbeat reduces the overall cardiac output, particularly because of the diving reflex in breath-hold diving. Lung volume decreases in the upright position, owing to cranial displacement of the abdomen from hydrostatic pressure, and resistance to air flow in the airways increases because of the decrease in lung volume. There appears to be a connection between pulmonary edema and increased pulmonary blood flow and pressure, which results in capillary engorgement. This may occur during higher intensity exercise while immersed or submerged.

The diving reflex is a response to immersion that overrides the basic homeostatic reflexes. It optimises respiration by preferentially distributing oxygen stores to the heart and brain, which allows extended periods underwater. It is exhibited strongly in aquatic mammals (seals, otters, dolphins and muskrats), and also exists in other mammals, including humans. Diving birds, such as penguins, have a similar diving reflex. The diving reflex is triggered by chilling the face and holding the breath. The cardiovascular system constricts peripheral blood vessels, slows the pulse rate, redirects blood to the vital organs to conserve oxygen, releases red blood cells stored in the spleen, and, in humans, causes heart rhythm irregularities. Aquatic mammals have evolved physiological adaptations to conserve oxygen during submersion, but apnea, slowed pulse rate, and vasoconstriction are shared with terrestrial mammals.

=== Exposure ===
Cold shock response is the physiological response of organisms to sudden cold, especially cold water, and is a common cause of death from immersion in very cold water, such as by falling through thin ice. The immediate shock of the cold causes involuntary inhalation, which if underwater can result in drowning. The cold water can also cause heart attack due to vasoconstriction; the heart has to work harder to pump the same volume of blood throughout the body, and for people with heart disease, this additional workload can cause the heart to go into arrest. A person who survives the initial minute after falling into cold water can survive for at least thirty minutes provided they do not drown. The ability to stay afloat declines substantially after about ten minutes as the chilled muscles lose strength and co-ordination.

Hypothermia is reduced core body temperature that occurs when a body loses more heat than it generates. It is a major limitation to swimming or diving in cold water. The reduction in finger dexterity due to pain or numbness decreases general safety and work capacity, which in turn increases the risk of other injuries. Non-freezing cold injury can affect the extremities in cold water diving, and frostbite can occur when air temperatures are low enough to cause tissue freezing. Body heat is lost much more quickly in water than in air, so water temperatures that would be tolerable as outdoor air temperatures can lead to hypothermia, which may lead to death from other causes in inadequately protected divers.

Thermoregulation of divers is complicated by breathing gases at raised ambient pressure and by gas mixtures necessary for limiting inert gas narcosis, work of breathing, and for accelerating decompression.

=== Breath-hold limitations ===
Breath-hold diving by an air-breathing animal is limited to the physiological capacity to perform the dive on the oxygen available until it returns to a source of fresh breathing gas, usually the air at the surface. As this internal oxygen supply reduces, the animal experiences an increasing urge to breathe caused by buildup of carbon dioxide and lactate in the blood, followed by loss of consciousness due to cerebral hypoxia. If this occurs underwater, it will drown.

Blackouts in freediving can occur when the breath is held long enough for metabolic activity to reduce the oxygen partial pressure sufficiently to cause loss of consciousness. This is accelerated by exertion, which uses oxygen faster, and can be exacerbated by hyperventilation directly before the dive, which reduces the carbon dioxide level in the blood. Lower carbon dioxide levels increase the oxygen-haemoglobin affinity, reducing availability of oxygen to brain tissue towards the end of the dive (Bohr effect); they also suppress the urge to breathe, making it easier to hold the breath to the point of blackout. This can happen at any depth.

Ascent-induced hypoxia is caused by a drop in oxygen partial pressure as ambient pressure is reduced. The partial pressure of oxygen at depth may be sufficient to maintain consciousness at that depth and not at the reduced pressures nearer the surface.

=== Ambient pressure changes ===
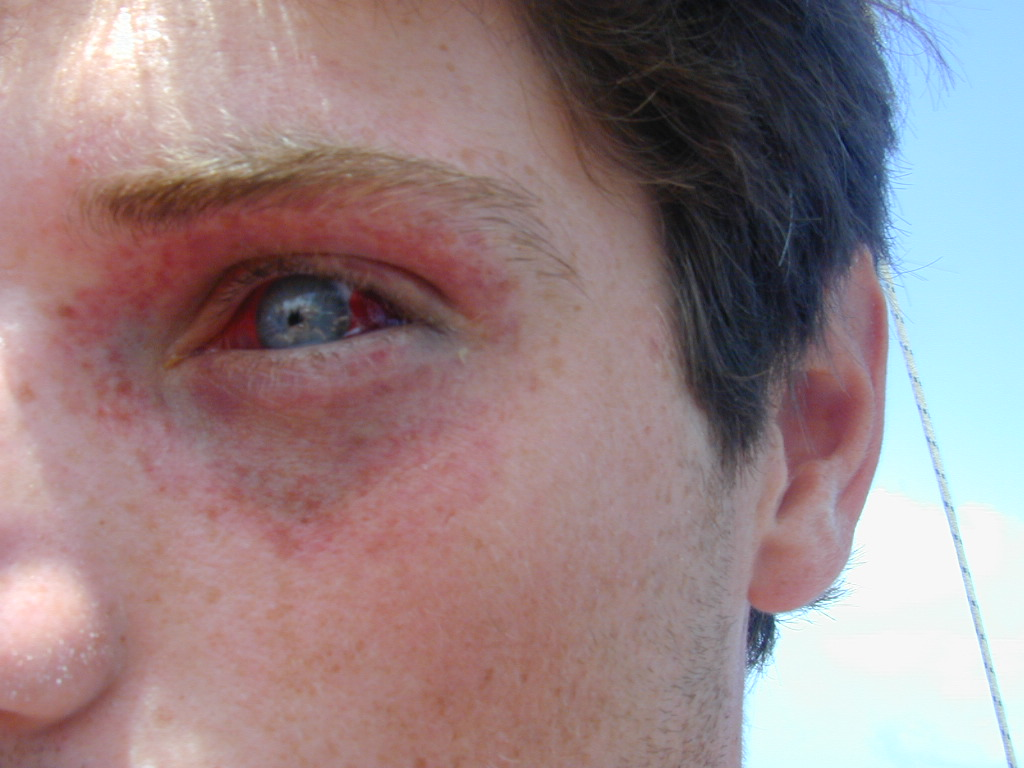
Mild barotrauma to a diver caused by mask squeeze

Barotrauma, a type of dysbarism, is physical damage to body tissues caused by a difference in pressure between a gas space inside, or in contact with the body, and the surrounding gas or fluid. It typically occurs when the organism is exposed to a large change in ambient pressure, such as when a diver ascends or descends. When diving, the pressure differences which cause the barotrauma are changes in hydrostatic pressure.

The initial damage is usually due to over-stretching the tissues in tension or shear, either directly by expansion of the gas in the closed space, or by pressure difference hydrostatically transmitted through the tissue.

Barotrauma generally manifests as sinus or middle ear effects, decompression sickness, lung over-expansion injuries, and injuries resulting from external squeezes. Barotraumas of descent are caused by preventing the free change of volume of the gas in a closed space in contact with the diver, resulting in a pressure difference between the tissues and the gas space, and the unbalanced force due to this pressure difference causes deformation of the tissues resulting in cell rupture. Barotraumas of ascent are also caused when the free change of volume of the gas in a closed space in contact with the diver is prevented. In this case the pressure difference causes a resultant tension in the surrounding tissues which exceeds their tensile strength. Besides tissue rupture, the overpressure may cause ingress of gases into the adjoining tissues and further afield by bubble transport through the circulatory system. This can cause blockage of circulation at distant sites, or interfere with the normal function of an organ by its presence.

=== Breathing under pressure ===
Provision of breathing gas at ambient pressure can greatly prolong the duration of a dive, but there are other problems that may result from this technological solution. Absorption of metabolically inert gases is increased as a function of time and pressure, and these may both produce undesirable effects immediately, as a consequence of their presence in the tissues in the dissolved state, such as nitrogen narcosis and high pressure nervous syndrome, or cause problems when coming out of solution within the tissues during decompression.

Other problems arise when the concentration of metabolically active gases is increased. These range from the toxic effects of oxygen at high partial pressure, through buildup of carbon dioxide due to excessive work of breathing, increased dead space, or inefficient removal, to the exacerbation of the toxic effects of contaminants in the breathing gas due to the increased concentration at high pressures. Hydrostatic pressure differences between the interior of the lung and the breathing gas delivery, increased breathing gas density due to ambient pressure, and increased flow resistance due to higher breathing rates may all cause increased work of breathing, fatigue of the respiratory muscles, and a physiological limit to effective ventilation. Studies of the effects of single dives have shown that hyperoxia and decompression stress can affect lung function directly following a dive, and hyperoxia can have a persistent residual effect on lung function for several years. Other studies indicate that a reduction in the conductance of small airways is related to accumulated diving exposure.

=== Sensory impairment ===
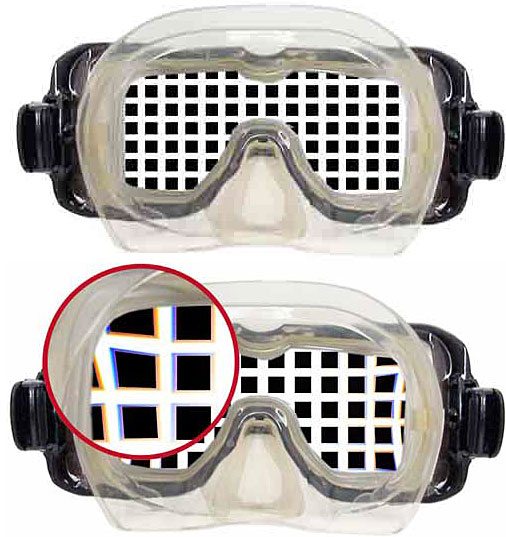
Views through a flat mask, above and below water

Underwater vision is affected by the clarity and the refractive index of the medium. Visibility underwater is reduced because light passing through water attenuates rapidly with distance, leading to lower levels of natural illumination. Underwater objects are also blurred by scattering of light between the object and the viewer, resulting in lower contrast. These effects vary with the wavelength of the light, and the colour and turbidity of the water. The human eye is optimised for air vision, and when it is immersed in direct contact with water, visual acuity is adversely affected by the difference in refractive index between water and air. Provision of an airspace between the cornea and the water can compensate, but causes scale and distance distortion. Artificial illumination can improve visibility at short range. Stereoscopic acuity, the ability to judge relative distances of different objects, is considerably reduced underwater, and this is affected by the field of vision. A narrow field of vision caused by a small viewport in a helmet results in greatly reduced stereoacuity, and an apparent movement of a stationary object when the head is moved. These effects lead to poorer hand-eye coordination.

Water has different acoustic properties from those of air. Sound from an underwater source can propagate relatively freely through body tissues where there is contact with the water as the acoustic properties are similar. When the head is exposed to the water, some sound is transmitted by the eardrum and middle ear, but a significant part reaches the cochlea independently, by bone conduction. Some sound localisation is possible, though difficult. Human hearing underwater, in cases where the diver's ear is wet, is less sensitive than in air. Frequency sensitivity underwater also differs from that in air, with a consistently higher threshold of hearing underwater; sensitivity to higher frequency sounds is reduced the most. The type of headgear affects noise sensitivity and noise hazard depending on whether transmission is wet or dry. Human hearing underwater is less sensitive with wet ears than in air, and a neoprene hood causes substantial attenuation. When wearing a helmet, hearing sensitivity is similar to that in surface air, as it is not greatly affected by the breathing gas or chamber atmosphere composition or pressure. Because sound travels faster in heliox than in air, voice formants are raised, making divers' speech high-pitched and distorted, and hard to understand for people not used to it. The increased density of breathing gases under pressure has a similar and additive effect.

Tactile sensory perception in divers may be impaired by the environmental protection suit and low temperatures. The combination of instability, equipment, neutral buoyancy and resistance to movement by the inertial and viscous effects of the water encumbers the diver. Cold causes losses in sensory and motor function and distracts from and disrupts cognitive activity. The ability to exert large and precise force is reduced.

Balance and equilibrium depend on vestibular function and secondary input from visual, organic, cutaneous, kinesthetic and sometimes auditory senses which are processed by the central nervous system to provide the sense of balance. Underwater, some of these inputs may be absent or diminished, making the remaining cues more important. Conflicting input may result in vertigo, disorientation and motion sickness. The vestibular sense is essential in these conditions for rapid, intricate and accurate movement. Proprioceptive perception makes the diver aware of personal position and movement, in association with the vestibular and visual input, and allows the diver to function effectively in maintaining physical equilibrium and balance in the water. In the water at neutral buoyancy, the proprioceptive cues of position are reduced or absent. This effect may be exacerbated by the diver's suit and other equipment.

Taste and smell are not very important to the diver in the water but more important to the saturation diver while in accommodation chambers. There is evidence of a slight decrease in threshold for taste and smell after extended periods under pressure.

== Diving modes ==
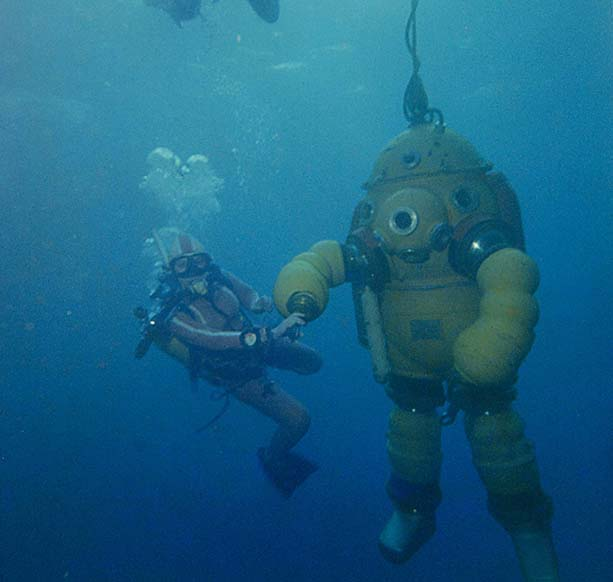
Two very different modes of diving: Ambient pressure open circuit scuba diving (left) and atmospheric pressure diving in a pressure resistant suit (right)

A mode of diving, or diving mode, is a particular way to dive underwater that requires specific equipment, procedures and techniques, and may expose the diver to a particular range of hazards.

There are several modes of diving; these are distinguished by the type of breathing apparatus, diving equipment, procedures and techniques involved, and whether the diver is exposed to ambient pressure. Ambient pressure diving includes freediving and compressed-gas diving, which may also be classed as air diving, oxygen diving, and mixed gas diving by the breathing gas used, and as open circuit, semi-closed, or closed circuit diving depending on the type of breathing apparatus used. There is also atmospheric pressure diving, which involves encapsulation in an atmospheric pressure diving suit or submersible, and unmanned diving, where there are no human divers involved. The diving equipment, support equipment and procedures used largely depend on the mode of diving.

In certain circumstances, some modes of diving may be impracticable, unsafe, not permitted by the governing organisation, or illegal. All modes of diving carry a certain amount of risk; this is mitigated with planning, training, and the appropriate equipment.

=== Freediving ===
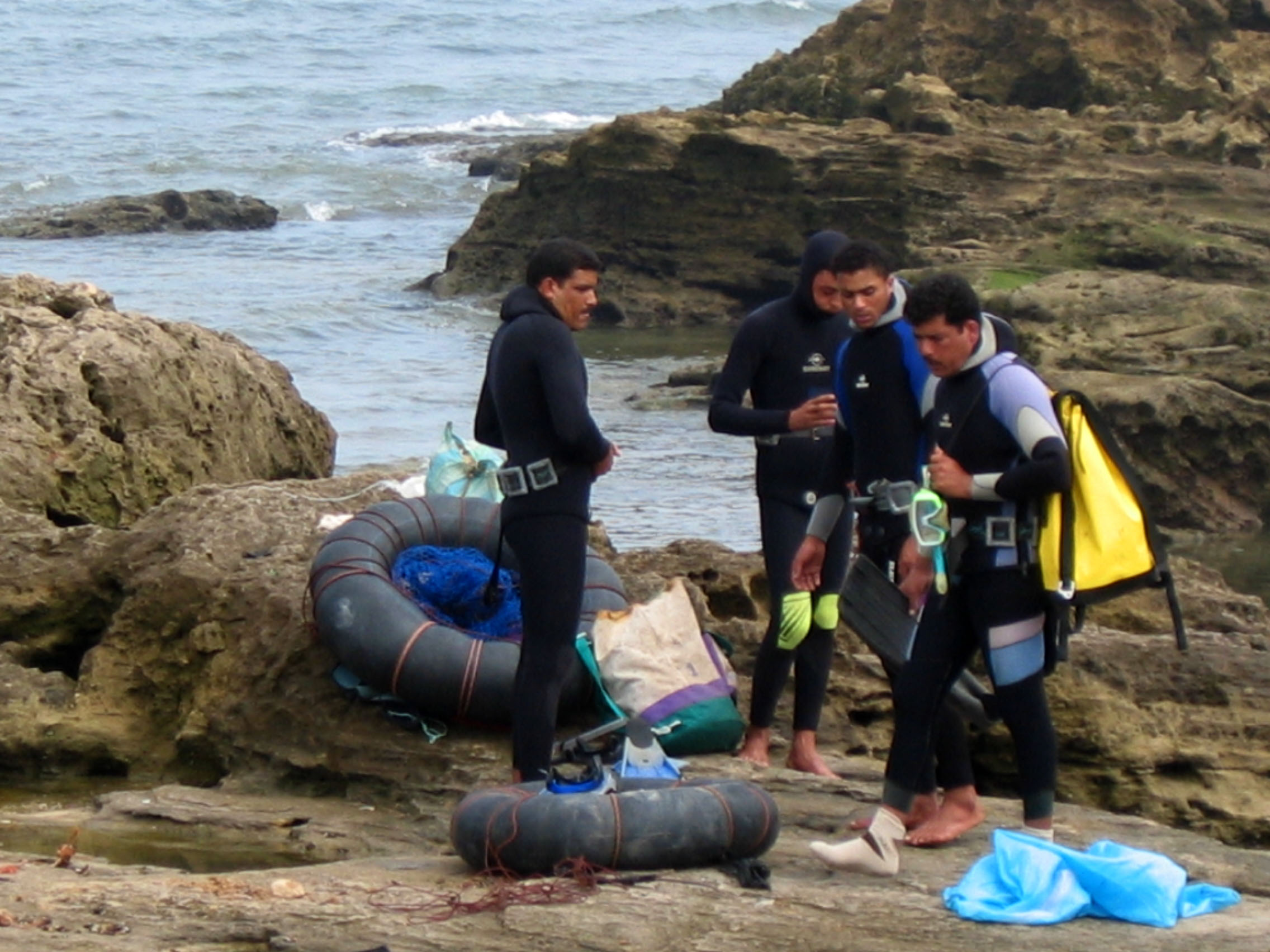
Recreational breath-hold divers in basic equipment with floats and catch bags suitable for collecting lobster or shellfish

The ability to dive and swim underwater while holding one's breath is considered a useful emergency skill, an important part of water sport and Navy safety training, and an enjoyable leisure activity. Underwater diving without breathing apparatus can be categorised as underwater swimming, snorkelling and freediving. These categories overlap considerably. Several competitive underwater sports are practised without breathing apparatus.

Freediving precludes the use of external breathing devices, and relies on the ability of divers to hold their breath until resurfacing. The technique ranges from simple breath-hold diving to competitive apnea dives. Fins and a diving mask are often used in free diving to improve vision and provide more efficient propulsion. A short breathing tube called a snorkel allows the diver to breathe at the surface while the face is immersed. Snorkelling on the surface with no intention of diving is a popular water sport and recreational activity.

=== Scuba diving ===
Scuba diving in open circuit and rebreather modes

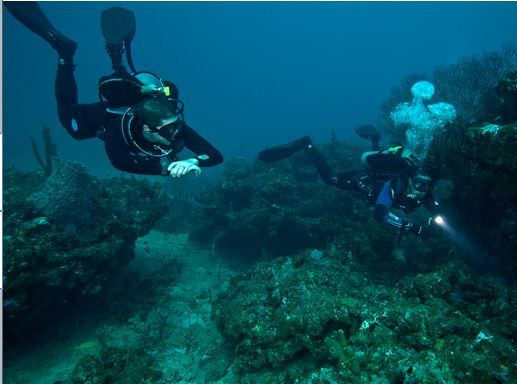
Recreational scuba divers on open circuit

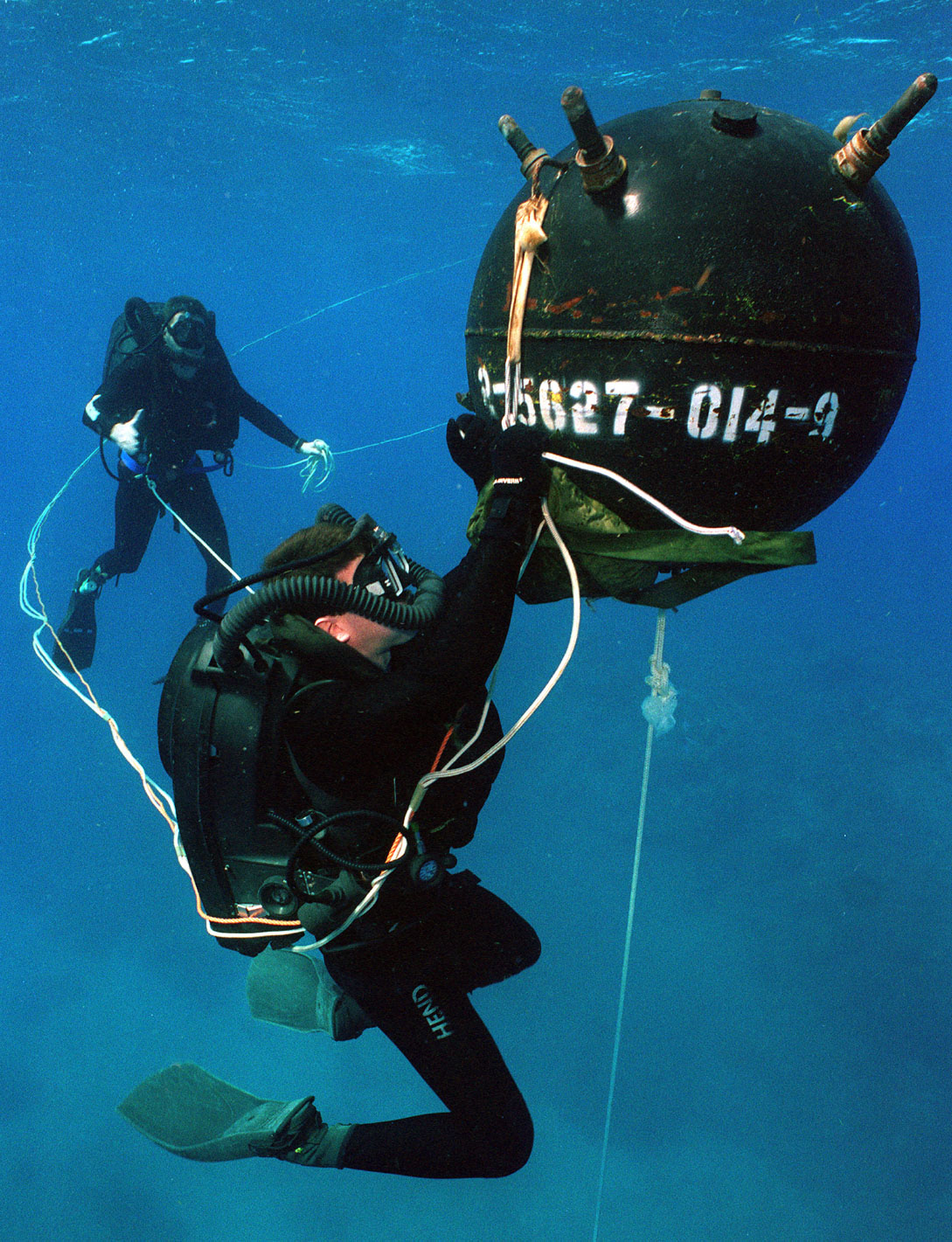
Explosive ordnance disposal divers using rebreathers

Scuba diving is diving with a self-contained underwater breathing apparatus, which is completely independent of surface supply. Scuba gives the diver mobility and horizontal range far beyond the reach of an umbilical hose attached to surface-supplied diving equipment (SSDE). Scuba divers engaged in armed forces covert operations may be referred to as frogmen, combat divers or attack swimmers.

Open circuit scuba systems discharge the breathing gas into the environment as it is exhaled, and consist of one or more diving cylinders containing breathing gas at high pressure which is supplied to the diver through a diving regulator. They may include additional cylinders for decompression gas or emergency breathing gas.

Closed-circuit or semi-closed circuit rebreather scuba systems allow recycling of exhaled gases. The volume of gas used is reduced compared to that of open circuit, so a smaller cylinder or cylinders may be used for an equivalent dive duration. They greatly extend the time spent underwater as compared to open circuit for the same gas consumption. Rebreathers produce fewer bubbles and less noise than scuba which makes them attractive to covert military divers to avoid detection, scientific divers to avoid disturbing marine animals, and media divers to avoid bubble interference.

A scuba diver moves underwater primarily by using fins attached to the feet; external propulsion can be provided by a diver propulsion vehicle, or a towboard pulled from the surface. Other equipment includes a diving mask to improve underwater vision, a protective diving suit, equipment to control buoyancy, and equipment related to the specific circumstances and purpose of the dive. Scuba divers are trained in the procedures and skills appropriate to their level of certification by instructors affiliated to the diver certification organisations which issue these diver certifications. These include standard operating procedures for using the equipment and dealing with the general hazards of the underwater environment, and emergency procedures for self-help and assistance of a similarly equipped diver experiencing problems. A minimum level of fitness and health is required by most training organisations, and a higher level of fitness may be needed for some applications.

=== Surface-supplied diving ===
Surface-supplied diving in surface-oriented and saturation modes

Surface-oriented diver entering the water

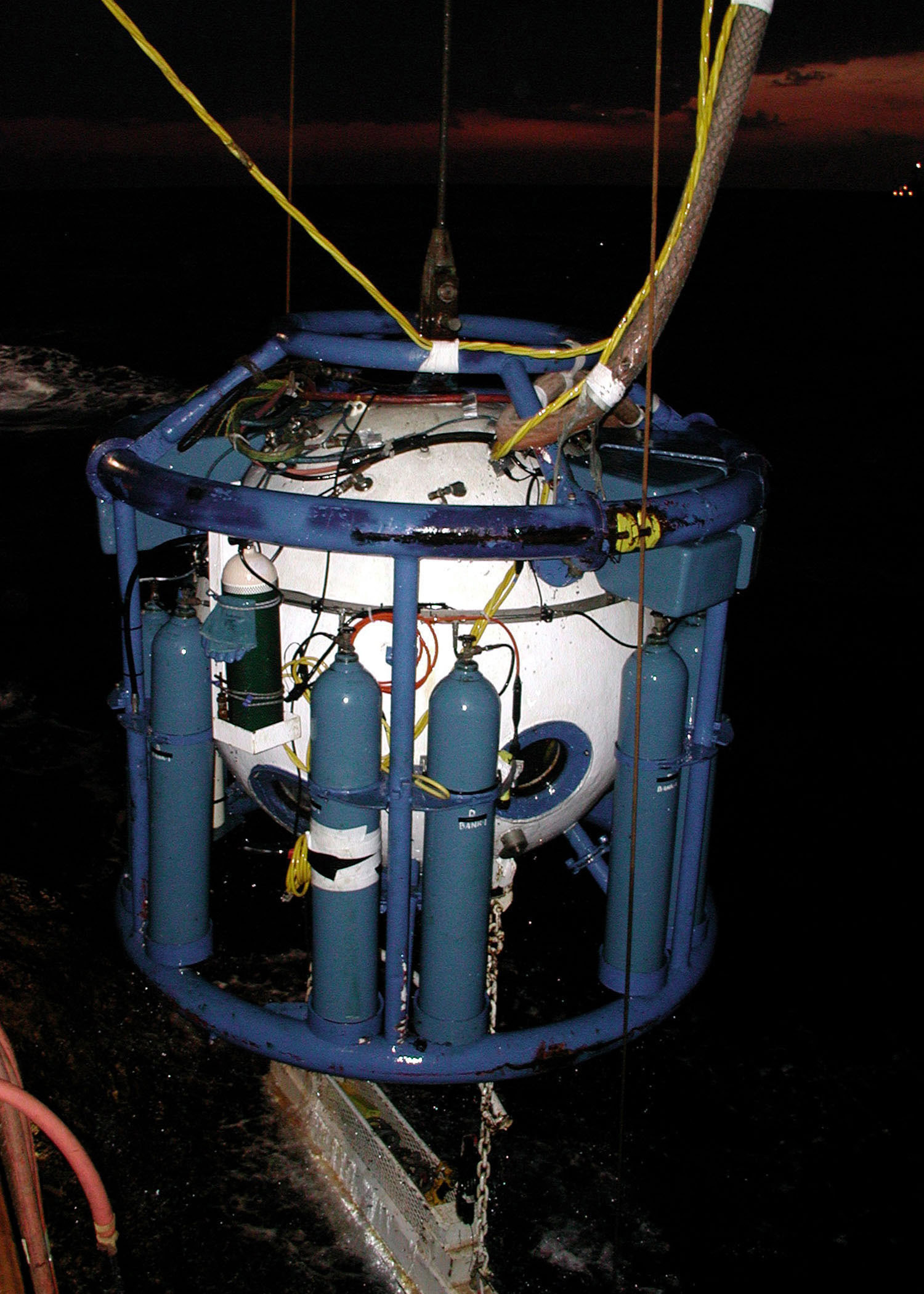
Closed diving bell, also known as a diver transfer capsule

An alternative to self-contained breathing systems is to supply breathing gases from the surface through a hose. When combined with a communication cable, a pneumofathometer hose and a safety line it is called the diver's umbilical, which may include a hot water hose for heating, video cable and breathing gas reclaim line. The diver wears a full-face mask or helmet, and gas may be supplied on demand or as a continuous free flow. More basic equipment that uses only an air hose is called an airline or hookah system. This allows the diver to breathe using an air supply hose from a high pressure cylinder or diving air compressor at the surface. Breathing gas is supplied through a mouth-held demand valve or light full-face mask. Airline diving is used for work such as hull cleaning and archaeological surveys, for shellfish harvesting, and as snuba, a shallow water activity typically practised by tourists and those who are not scuba-certified.

Saturation diving lets professional divers live and work under pressure for days or weeks at a time. After working in the water, the divers rest and live in a dry pressurised underwater habitat on the bottom or a saturation life support system of pressure chambers on the deck of a diving support vessel, oil platform or other floating platform at a similar pressure to the work depth. They are transferred between the surface accommodation and the underwater workplace in a pressurised closed diving bell. Decompression at the end of the dive may take many days, but since it is done only once for a long period of exposure, rather than after each of many shorter exposures, the overall risk of decompression injury to the diver and the total time spent decompressing are reduced. This type of diving allows greater work efficiency and safety.

Commercial divers refer to diving operations where the diver starts and finishes the diving operation at atmospheric pressure as surface oriented, or bounce diving. Surface-supplied diving is used for offshore inspection, maintenance, repair, construction, modification and intervention work on oil and gas installations, offshore wind farms and inshore sites.The diver may be deployed from the shore or a diving support vessel and may be transported on a diving stage or in a diving bell. Surface-supplied divers almost always wear diving helmets or full-face diving masks. The bottom gas can be air, nitrox, heliox or trimix; the decompression gases may be similar, or may include pure oxygen. Decompression procedures include in-water decompression or surface decompression in a deck chamber.

A wet bell with a gas filled dome provides more comfort and control than a stage and allows for longer time in water. Wet bells are used for air and mixed gas, and divers can decompress on oxygen at 12 metres (40 ft). Small closed bell systems have been designed that can be easily mobilised, and include a two-man bell, a launch and recovery system and a chamber for decompression after transfer under pressure (TUP). Divers can breathe air or mixed gas at the bottom and are usually recovered with the chamber filled with air. They decompress on oxygen supplied through built in breathing systems (BIBS) towards the end of the decompression. Small bell systems support bounce diving down to 120 metres (390 ft) and for bottom times up to 2 hours.

A relatively portable surface gas supply system using high pressure gas cylinders for both primary and reserve gas, but using the full diver's umbilical system with pneumofathometer and voice communication, is known in the industry as "scuba replacement".

Compressor diving is a rudimentary method of surface-supplied diving used in some tropical regions such as the Philippines and the Caribbean. The divers swim with a half mask and fins and are supplied with air from an industrial low-pressure air compressor on the boat through plastic tubes. There is no reduction valve; the diver holds the hose end in his mouth with no demand valve or mouthpiece and allows excess air to spill out between the lips.

=== Air and gas diving ===
The original breathing gas for diving was atmospheric air, and compressed air remains an important breathing gas for ambient pressure diving. Oxygen is limited to shallow water to avoid toxicity problems, and is usually used to accelerate decompression, or by tactical divers to provide a long endurance with a small amount of gas, and to minimise bubbles where detection would be a tactical problem. Some physiological problems of deeper diving, such as inert gas narcosis and high work of breathing, can be mitigated by the use of breathing gases based on helium, and experimental work which includes hydrogen in the mixture for extreme depths, continues. The common terminology refers to air diving and gas diving, which includes oxygen diving, and mixed gas diving, which includes nitrox diving, trimix diving, and heliox diving.

Air is available for the cost of operating the compressor, so it is supplied on open circuit, and discharged into the surroundings on exhalation, and may be supplied through a free-flow system where this has advantages. Oxygen and nitrox are also cheap enough that it is usually economical to supply by demand open circuit except for long duration scuba operations, but helium is expensive and sometimes in short supply, so recycling can be viable for moderate usage, and essential for high volume usage. The costs of recycling by rebreathing or reclaiming helium based gases include high capital investment in the equipment, and additional running costs compared to open circuit. The use of hydrogen as a breathing gas component is still experimental.

=== Atmospheric pressure diving ===
Atmospheric pressure suit and submersible modes

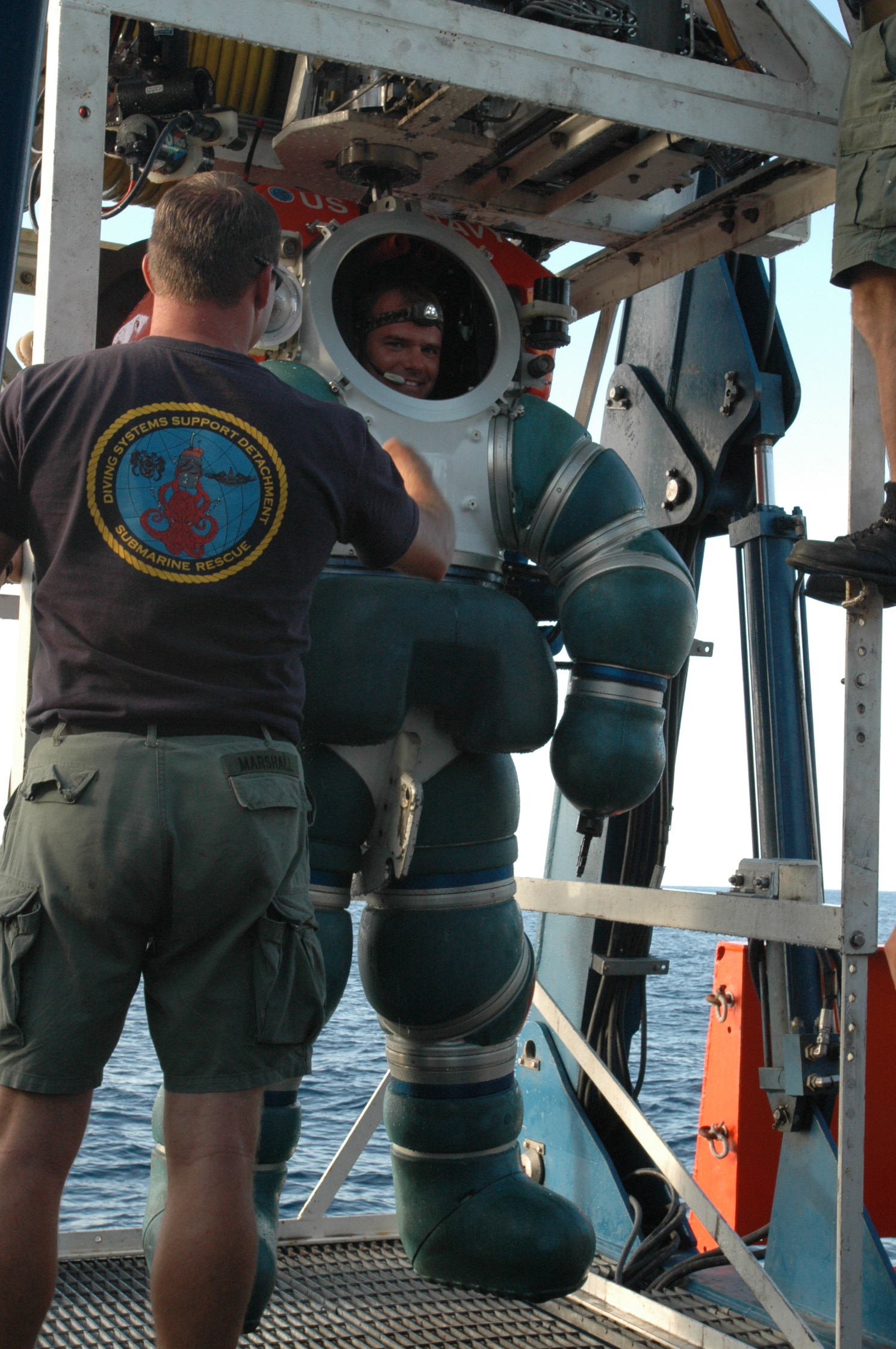
US Navy Atmospheric Diving System (ADS)

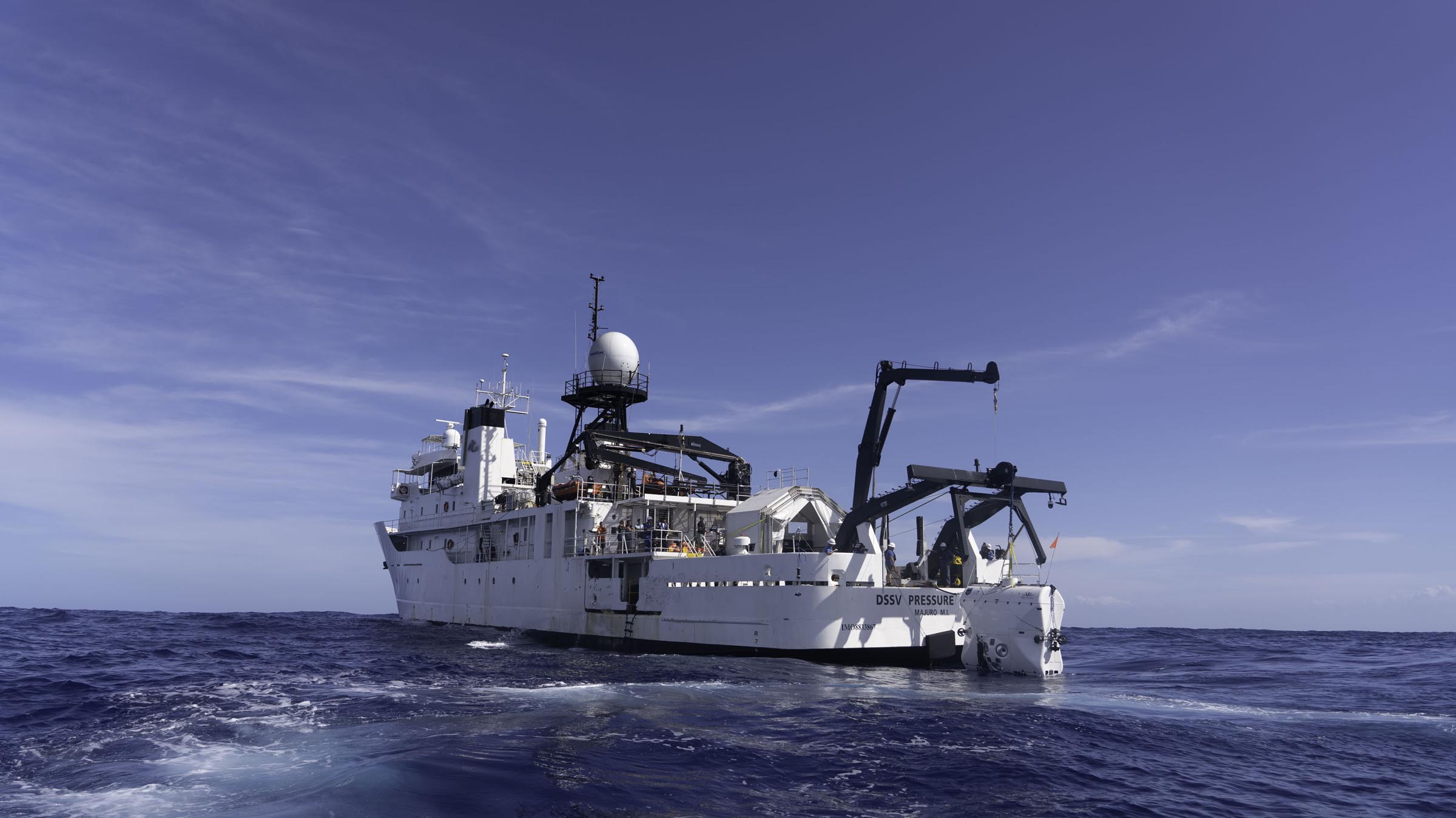
Full ocean depth rated DSV Limiting Factor prepared for a dive into the Atlantic Ocean

Submersibles and rigid atmospheric diving suits (ADS) enable diving to be carried out in a dry environment at normal atmospheric pressure. An ADS is a small one-person articulated submersible which resembles a suit of armour, with elaborate joints to allow articulation by direct motion of the limbs, while maintaining an internal pressure of one atmosphere. An ADS can be used for dives of up to about 700 metres (2,300 ft) for many hours. It eliminates the majority of physiological dangers associated with deep diving – the occupant does not need to decompress, there is no need for special gas mixtures, and there is no danger of nitrogen narcosis – at the expense of higher cost, complex logistics and loss of dexterity. Crewed submersibles have been built rated to full ocean depth and have dived to the deepest known points of all the oceans.

=== Unmanned diving ===
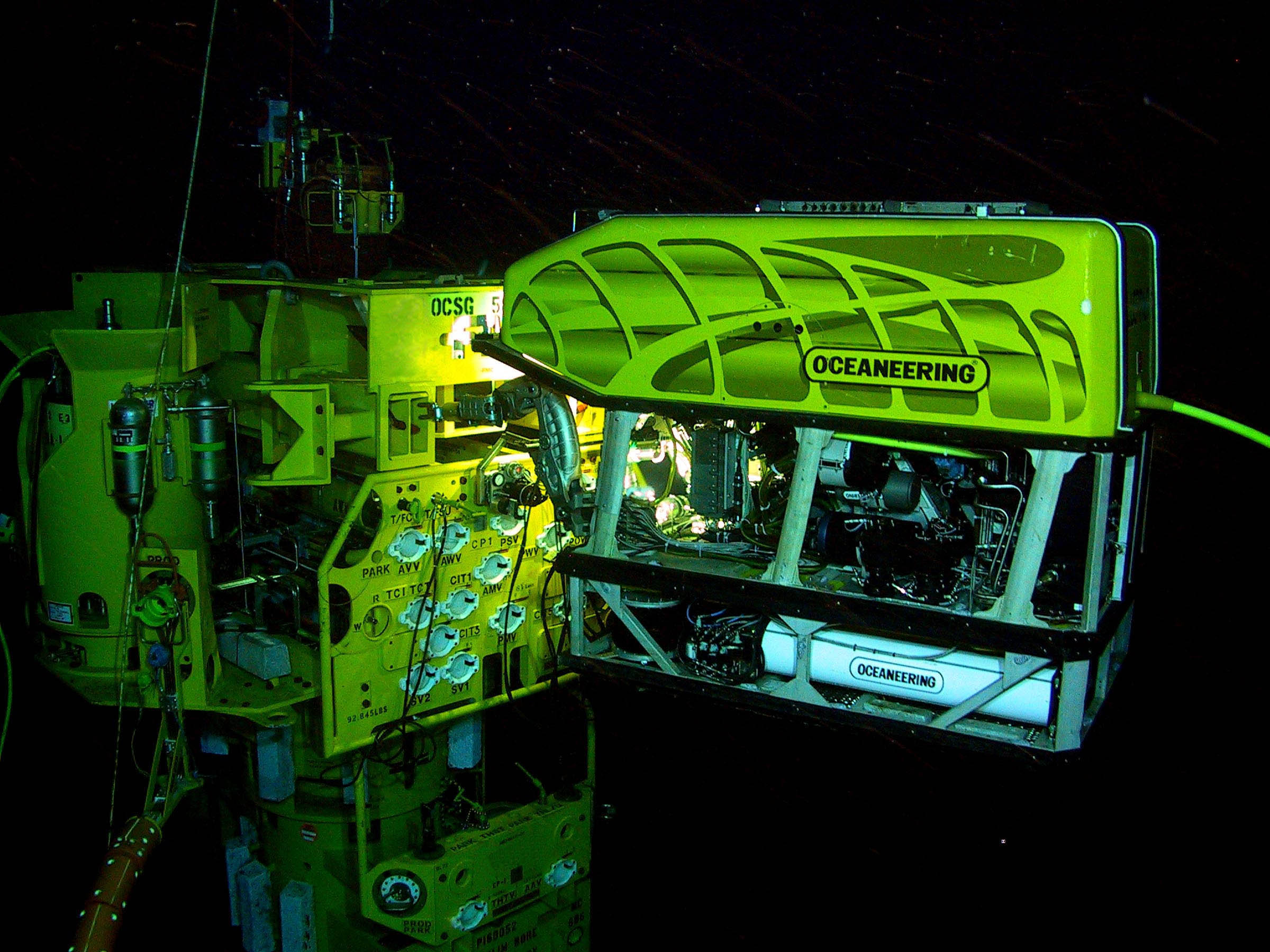
ROV working on a subsea structure

Autonomous underwater vehicles (AUVs) and remotely operated underwater vehicles (ROVs) can carry out some functions of divers. They can be deployed at greater depths and in more dangerous environments. An AUV is a robot which travels underwater without requiring real-time input from an operator. AUVs constitute part of a larger group of unmanned undersea systems, a classification that includes non-autonomous ROVs, which are controlled and powered from the surface by an operator/pilot via an umbilical or using remote control. In military applications AUVs are often referred to as unmanned undersea vehicles (UUVs).

== Diving activities ==
Diving activities

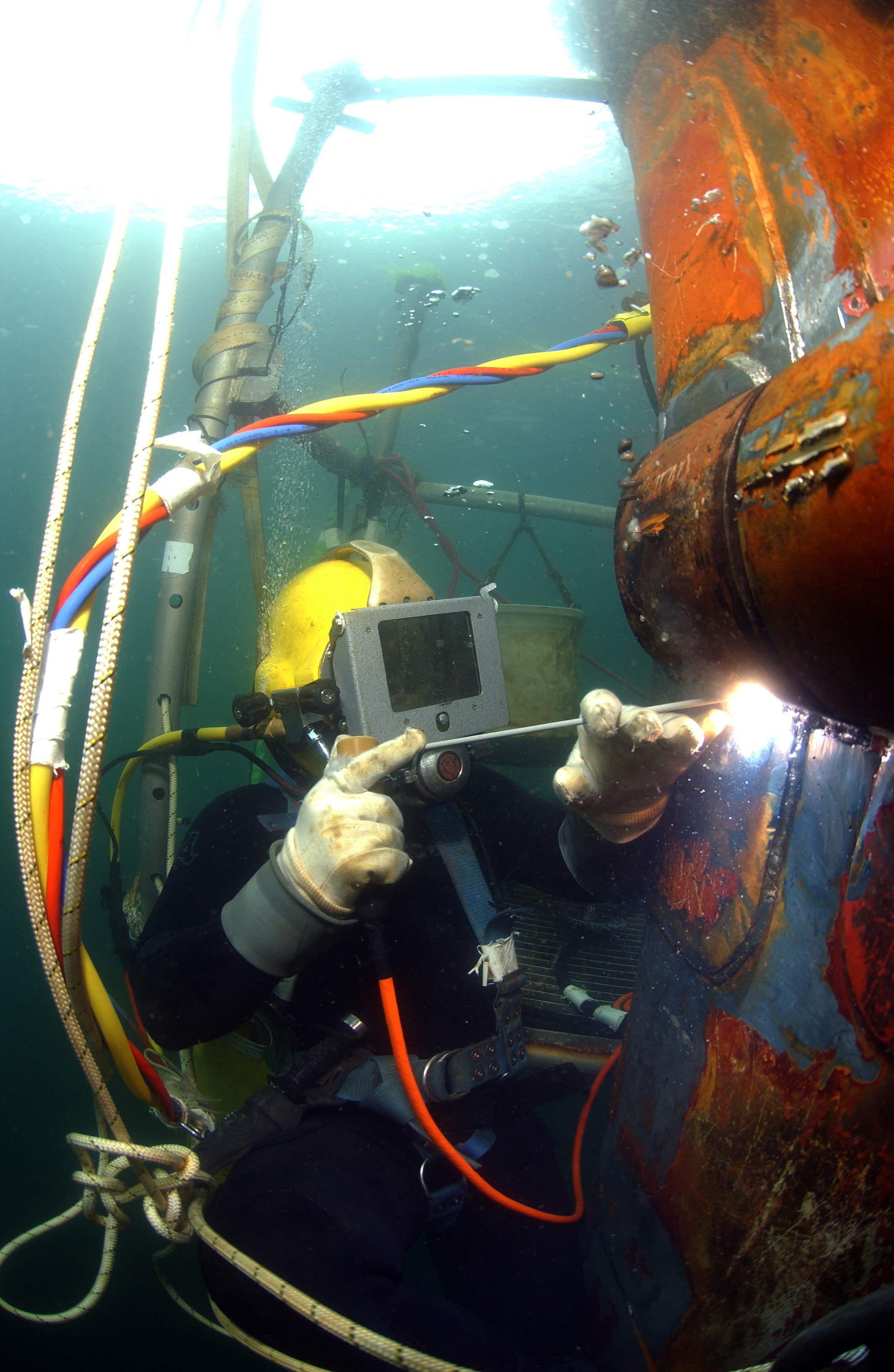
Ship repair work may involve underwater welding

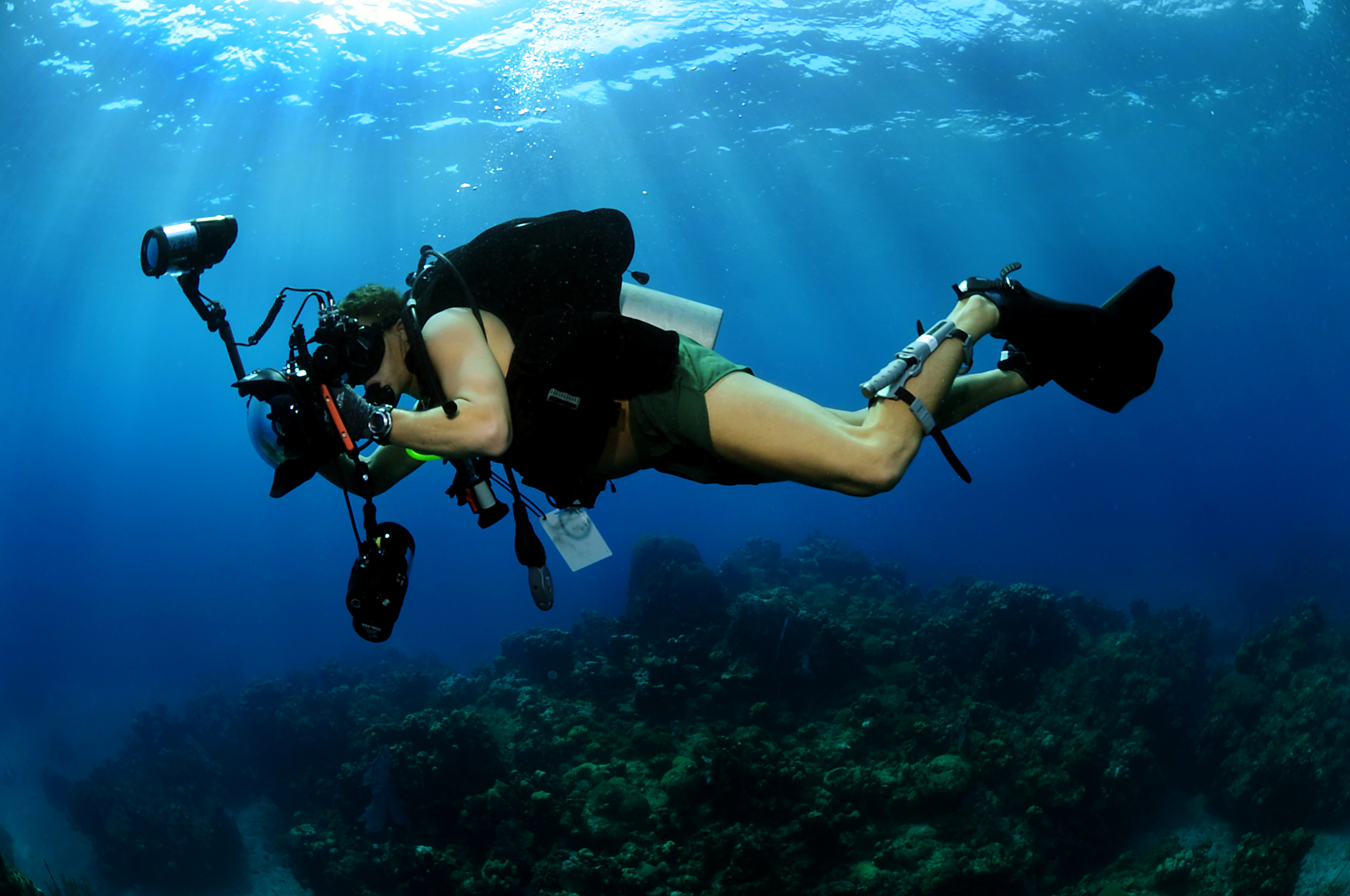
Underwater photography is done by recreational and professional divers.

People may dive for various reasons, both personal and professional. While a newly qualified recreational diver may dive purely for the experience of diving, most divers have some additional reason for being underwater. Recreational diving is purely for enjoyment and has several specialisations and technical disciplines to provide more scope for varied activities for which specialist training can be offered, such as cave diving, wreck diving, ice diving and deep diving. Several underwater sports are available for exercise and competition.

There are various aspects of professional diving that range from part-time work to lifelong careers. Professionals in the recreational diving industry include instructor trainers, diving instructors, assistant instructors, divemasters, dive guides, and scuba technicians. A scuba diving tourism industry has developed to service recreational diving in regions with popular dive sites. Commercial diving is industry related and includes engineering tasks such as in hydrocarbon exploration, offshore construction, dam maintenance and harbour works. Commercial divers may also be employed to perform tasks related to marine activities, such as naval diving, ships husbandry, marine salvage or aquaculture.

Other specialist areas of diving include military diving, with a long history of military frogmen in various roles. They can perform roles including direct combat, reconnaissance, infiltration behind enemy lines, placing mines, bomb disposal or engineering operations.

In civilian operations, police diving units perform search and rescue operations, and recover evidence. In some cases diver rescue teams may also be part of a fire department, paramedical service, sea rescue or lifeguard unit, and this may be classed as public safety diving. There are also professional media divers such as underwater photographers and videographers, who record the underwater world, and scientific divers in fields of study which involve the underwater environment, including marine biologists, geologists, hydrologists, oceanographers, speleologists and underwater archaeologists.

The choice between scuba and surface-supplied diving equipment is based on both legal and logistical constraints. Where the diver requires mobility and a large range of movement, scuba is usually the choice if safety and legal constraints allow. Higher risk work, particularly commercial diving, may be restricted to surface-supplied equipment by legislation and codes of practice.

== History ==
Diving history

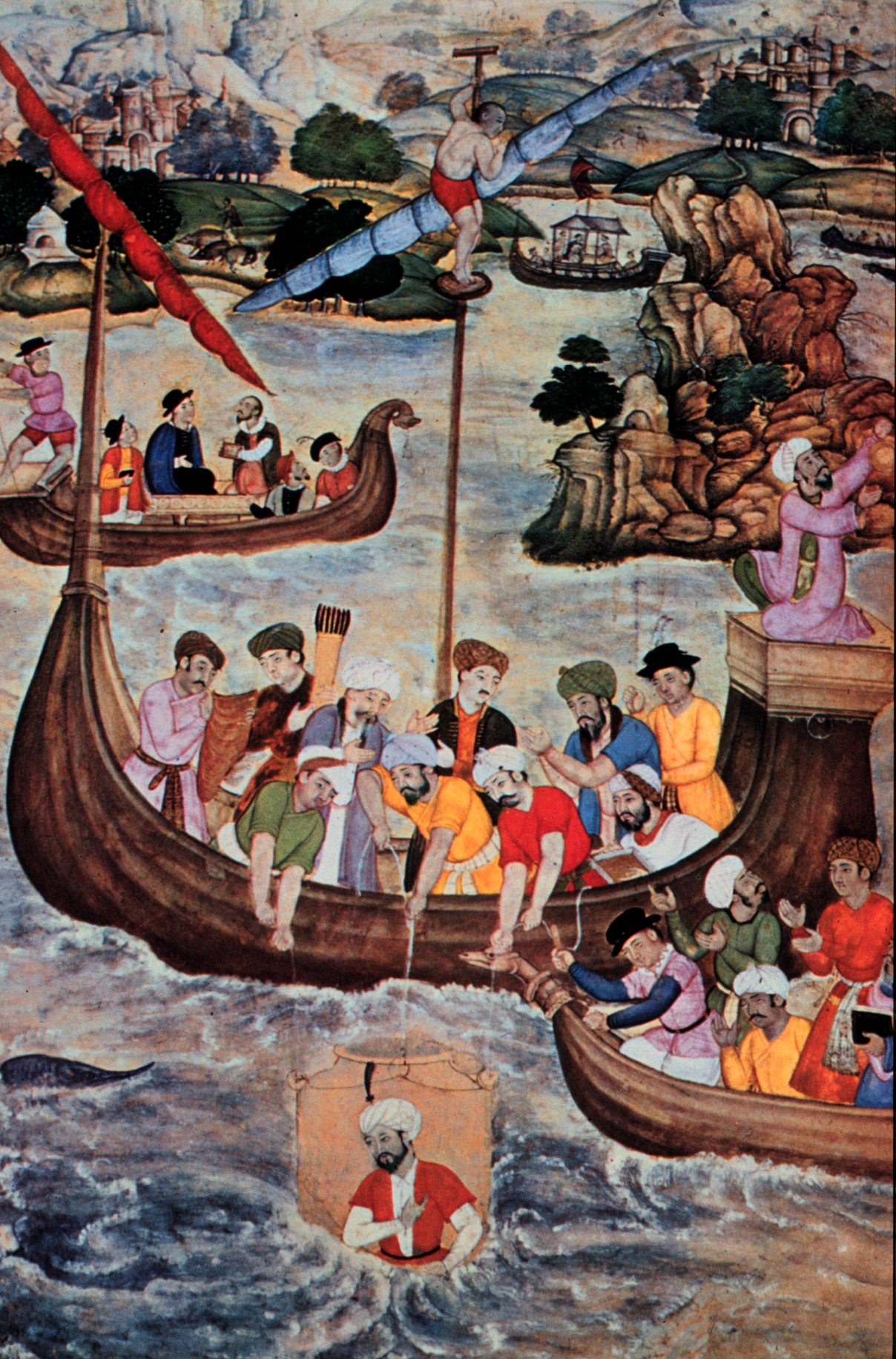
16th-century Islamic painting of Alexander the Great lowered in a glass diving bell

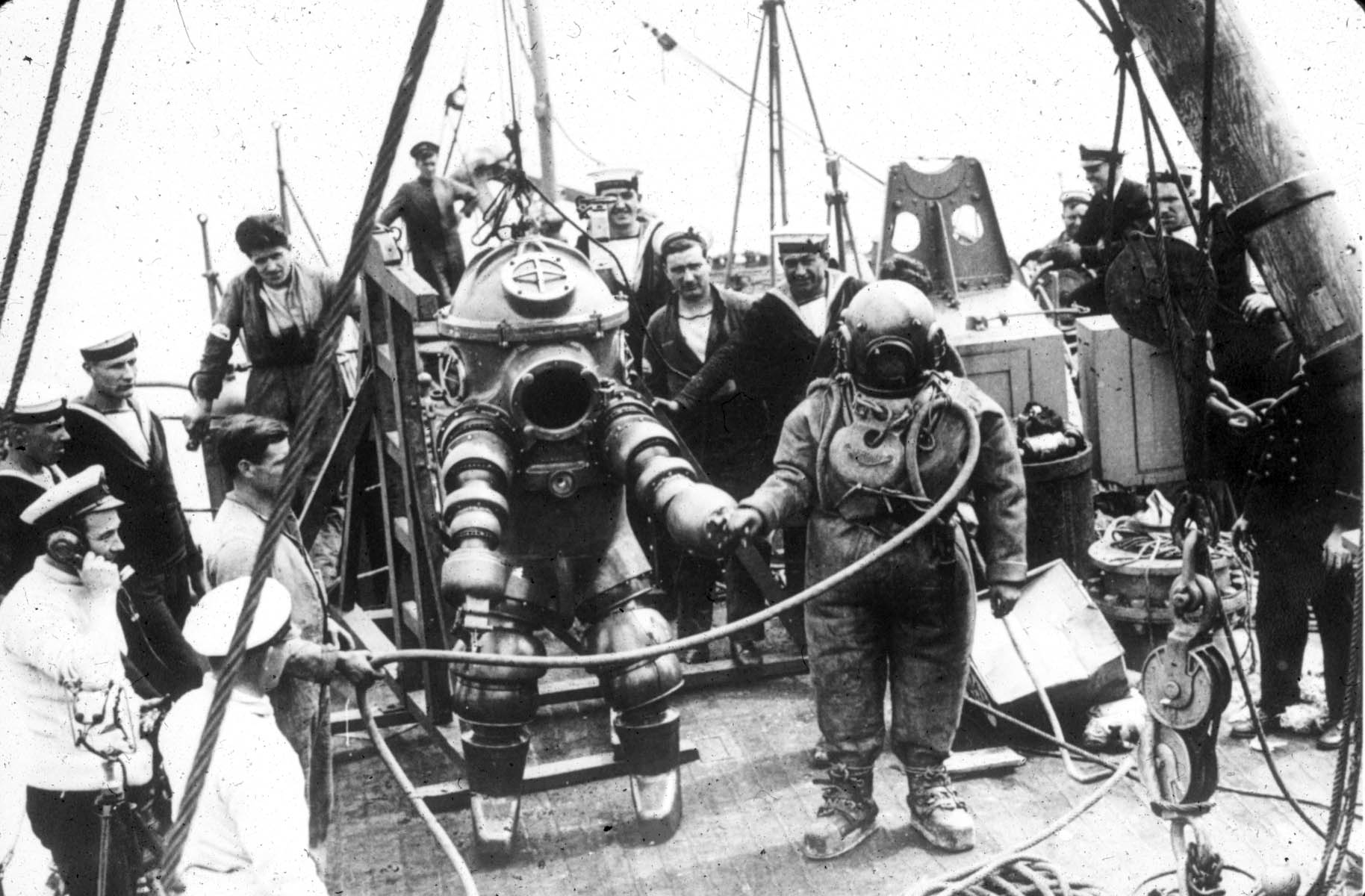
Two divers, one wearing the Tritonia ADS and the other standard diving dress, preparing to explore the wreck of the RMS Lusitania, 1935

Freediving as a widespread means of hunting and gathering, both for food and other valuable resources such as pearls and coral, dates from before 4500 BCE. By classical Greek and Roman times commercial diving applications such as sponge diving and marine salvage were established. Military diving goes back at least as far as the Peloponnesian War, with recreational and sporting applications being a recent development. Technological development in ambient pressure diving started with stone weights (skandalopetra) for fast descent, with rope assist for ascent. The diving bell is one of the earliest types of equipment for underwater work and exploration. Its use was first described by Aristotle in the 4th century BCE. In the 16th and 17th centuries CE, diving bells became more useful when a renewable supply of air could be provided to the diver at depth, and progressed to surface-supplied diving helmets – in effect miniature diving bells covering the diver's head and supplied with compressed air by manually operated pumps – which were improved by attaching a waterproof suit to the helmet. In the early 19th century these became the standard diving dress, which made a far wider range of marine civil engineering and salvage projects practicable.

Limitations in mobility of the surface-supplied systems encouraged the development of both open circuit and closed circuit scuba in the 20th century, which allow the diver a much greater autonomy. These became popular during the Second World War for clandestine military operations, and post-war for scientific, search and rescue, media diving, recreational and technical diving. The heavy free-flow surface-supplied copper helmets evolved into lightweight demand helmets, which are more economical with breathing gas, important for deeper dives using expensive helium based breathing mixtures. Saturation diving reduced the risks of decompression sickness for deep and long exposures.

An alternative approach was the development of the ADS or armoured suit, which isolates the diver from the pressure at depth, at the cost of mechanical complexity and limited dexterity. The technology first became practicable in the middle 20th century. Isolation of the diver from the environment was taken further by the development of remotely operated underwater vehicles (ROV or ROUV) in the late 20th century, where the operator controls the ROV from the surface, and autonomous underwater vehicles (AUV), which dispense with an operator altogether. All of these modes are still in use and each has a range of applications where it has advantages over the others, though diving bells have largely been relegated to a means of transport for surface-supplied divers. In some cases combinations are particularly effective, such as the simultaneous use of surface orientated or saturation surface-supplied diving equipment and work or observation class remotely operated vehicles.

=== Physiological discoveries ===
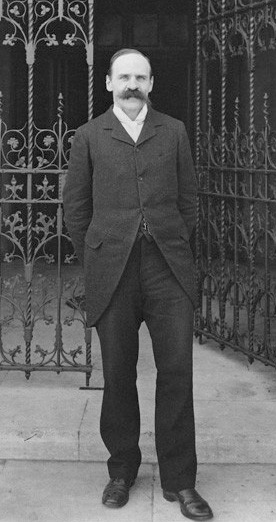
John Scott Haldane, 1902

By the late 19th century, as salvage operations became deeper and longer, an unexplained malady began afflicting the divers; they would suffer breathing difficulties, dizziness, joint pain and paralysis, sometimes leading to death. The problem was already well known among workers building tunnels and bridge footings operating under pressure in caissons and was initially called caisson disease; it was later renamed the bends because the joint pain typically caused the sufferer to stoop. Early reports of the disease had been made at the time of Charles Pasley's salvage operation, but scientists were still ignorant of its causes.

French physiologist Paul Bert was the first to understand it as decompression sickness (DCS). His work, La Pression barométrique (1878), was a comprehensive investigation into the physiological effects of air pressure, both above and below the normal. He determined that inhaling pressurised air caused nitrogen to dissolve into the bloodstream; rapid depressurisation would then release the nitrogen into its gaseous state, forming bubbles that could block the blood circulation and potentially cause paralysis or death. Central nervous system oxygen toxicity was also first described in this publication and is sometimes referred to as the "Paul Bert effect".

John Scott Haldane designed a decompression chamber in 1907, and he produced the first decompression tables for the Royal Navy in 1908 after extensive experiments with animals and human subjects. These tables established a method of decompression in stages – it remains the basis for decompression methods to this day. Following Haldane's recommendation, the maximum safe operating depth for divers was extended to 61 metres (200 ft).

The US Navy continued research into decompression, and in 1915 the first Bureau of Construction and Repair decompression tables were developed by French and Stilson. Experimental dives were conducted in the 1930s, forming the basis for the 1937 US Navy air decompression tables. Surface decompression and oxygen use were also researched in the 1930s. The US Navy 1957 tables were developed to correct problems found in the 1937 tables.

In 1965 Hugh LeMessurier and Brian Andrew Hills published their paper, A thermodynamic approach arising from a study on Torres Strait diving techniques, which suggested that decompression following schedules based on conventional models results in asymptomatic bubble formation which must then be re-dissolved at the decompression stops before it can be eliminated. This is slower than allowing the gas to be eliminated while it is still in solution, and indicates the importance of minimising bubble phase gas for efficient decompression.

M.P. Spencer showed that Doppler ultrasonic methods can detect venous bubbles in asymptomatic divers, and Dr Andrew Pilmanis showed that safety stops reduced bubble formation. In 1981 D.E. Yount described the Varying Permeability Model, proposing a mechanism of bubble formation. Several other bubble models followed. The pathophysiology of decompression sickness is not yet fully understood, but decompression practice has reached a stage where the risk is fairly low, and most incidents are successfully treated by therapeutic recompression and hyperbaric oxygen therapy. Mixed breathing gases are used to reduce the effects of the hyperbaric environment on ambient pressure divers.

Efficient decompression requires the diver to ascend fast enough to establish as high a decompression gradient, in as many tissues as safely possible, without provoking the development of symptomatic bubbles. This is facilitated by the highest acceptably safe oxygen partial pressure in the breathing gas, and avoiding gas changes that could cause counterdiffusion bubble formation or growth. The development of schedules that are both safe and efficient has been complicated by the large number of variables and uncertainties, including personal variation in response under varying environmental conditions and workload.

== Diving environment ==
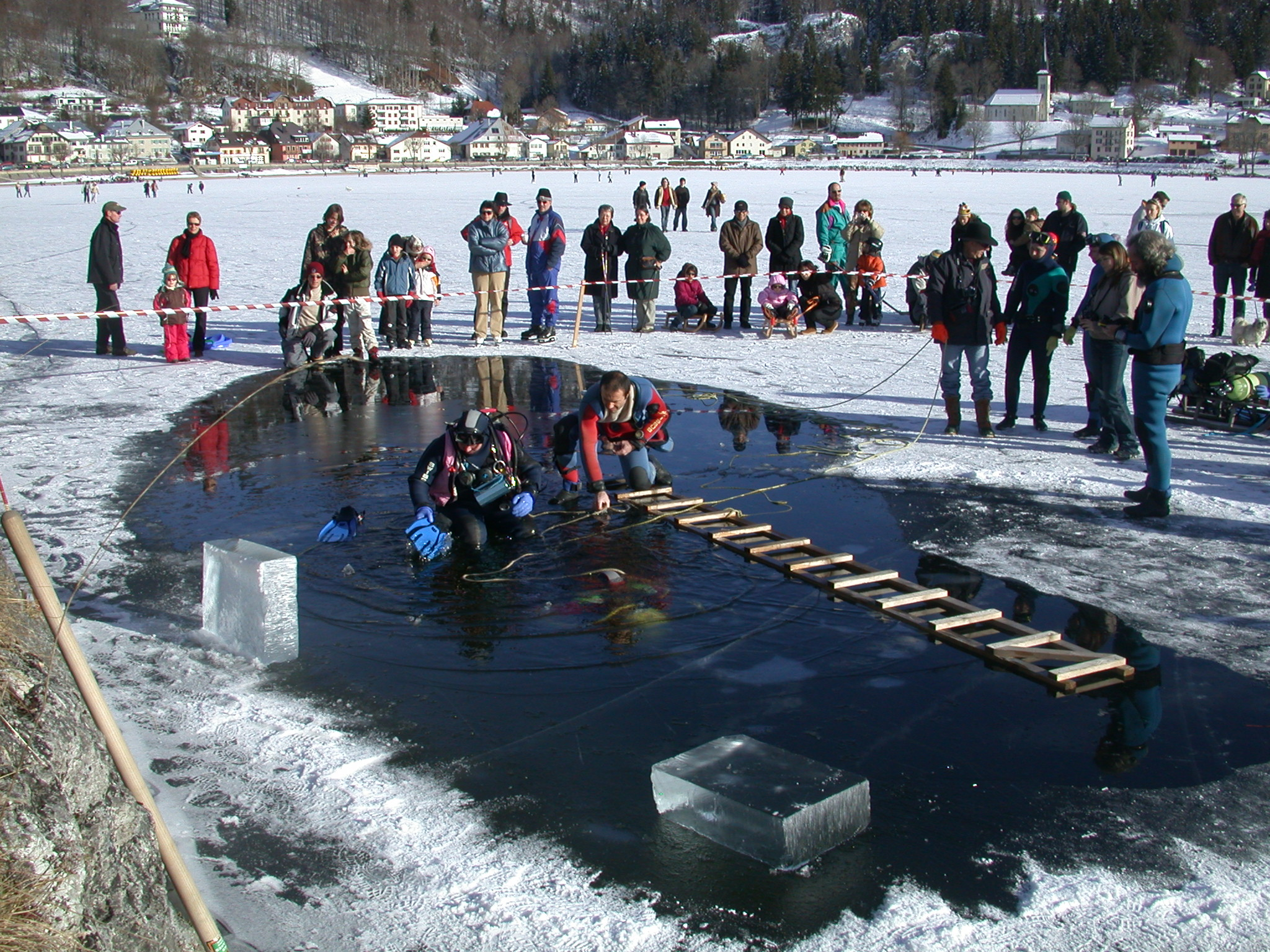
Ice diving

The diving environment is limited by accessibility and risk, but includes water and occasionally other liquids. Most underwater diving is done in the shallower coastal parts of the oceans, and inland bodies of fresh water, including lakes, dams, quarries, rivers, springs, flooded caves, reservoirs, tanks, swimming pools, and canals, but may also be done in large bore ducting and sewers, power station cooling systems, cargo and ballast tanks of ships, and liquid-filled industrial equipment. The environment may affect gear configuration: for instance, freshwater is less dense than saltwater, so less added weight is needed to achieve diver neutral buoyancy in freshwater dives. Water temperature, visibility and movement also affect the diver and the dive plan. Diving in liquids other than water may present special problems due to density, viscosity and chemical compatibility of diving equipment, as well as possible environmental hazards to the diving team.

Benign conditions, sometimes also referred to as confined water, are environments of low risk, where it is extremely unlikely or impossible for the diver to get lost or entrapped, or be exposed to hazards other than the basic underwater environment. These conditions are suitable for initial training in the critical survival skills, and include swimming pools, training tanks, aquarium tanks and some shallow and protected shoreline areas.

Open water is unrestricted water such as a sea, lake or flooded quarry, where the diver has unobstructed direct vertical access to the surface of the water in contact with the atmosphere. Open-water diving implies that if a problem arises, the diver can directly ascend vertically to the atmosphere to breathe air. Wall diving is done along a near vertical face. Blue-water diving is done in good visibility in mid-water where the bottom is out of sight of the diver and there may be no fixed visual reference. Black-water diving is mid-water diving at night, particularly on a moonless night.

An overhead or penetration diving environment is where the diver enters a space from which there is no direct, purely vertical ascent to the safety of breathable atmosphere at the surface. Cave diving, wreck diving, ice diving and diving inside or under other natural or artificial underwater structures or enclosures are examples. The restriction on direct ascent increases the risk of diving under an overhead, and this is usually addressed by adaptations of procedures and use of equipment such as redundant breathing gas sources and guide lines to indicate the route to the exit.

Night diving can allow the diver to experience a different underwater environment, because many marine animals are nocturnal. Altitude diving, for example in mountain lakes, requires modifications to the decompression schedule because of the reduced atmospheric pressure.

=== Depth range ===
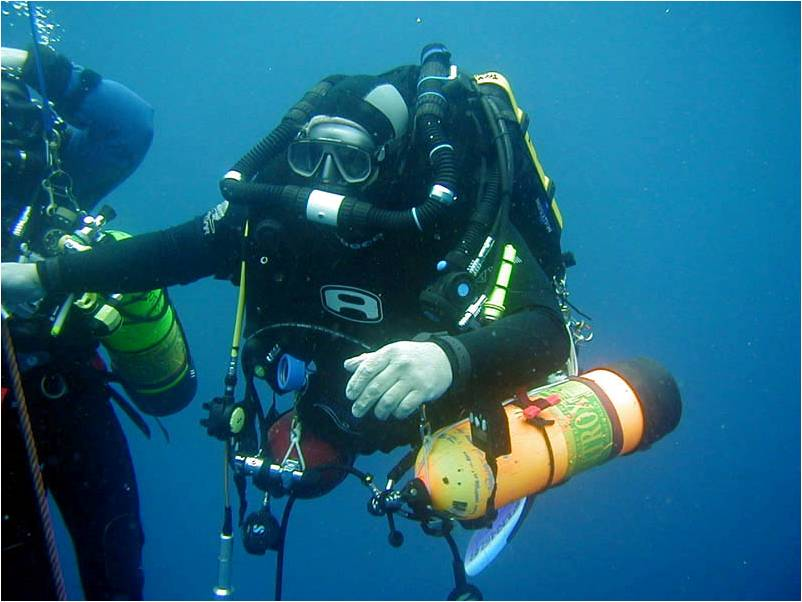
A technical diver using a closed circuit rebreather with open circuit bailout cylinders returns from a 600-foot (180 m) dive.

The recreational diving depth limit set by the EN 14153-2 / ISO 24801-2 level 2 "Autonomous Diver " standard is 20 metres (66 ft). The recommended depth limit for more extensively trained recreational divers ranges from 30 metres (98 ft) for PADI divers, (this is the depth at which nitrogen narcosis symptoms generally begin to be noticeable in adults), to 40 metres (130 ft) specified by Recreational Scuba Training Council, 50 metres (160 ft) for divers of the British Sub-Aqua Club and Sub-Aqua Association breathing air, and 60 metres (200 ft) for teams of 2 to 3 French Level 3 recreational divers, breathing air.

For technical divers, the recommended maximum depths are greater on the understanding that they will use less narcotic gas mixtures. 100 metres (330 ft) is the maximum depth authorised for divers who have completed Trimix Diver certification with IANTD or Advanced Trimix Diver certification with TDI. 332 metres (1,089 ft) is the world record depth on scuba (2014). Commercial divers using saturation techniques and heliox breathing gases routinely exceed 100 metres (330 ft), but they are also limited by physiological constraints. Comex Hydra 8 experimental dives reached a record open water depth of 534 metres (1,752 ft) in 1988. Atmospheric pressure diving suits are mainly constrained by the technology of the articulation seals, and a US Navy diver has dived to 610 metres (2,000 ft) in one.

=== Dive sites ===
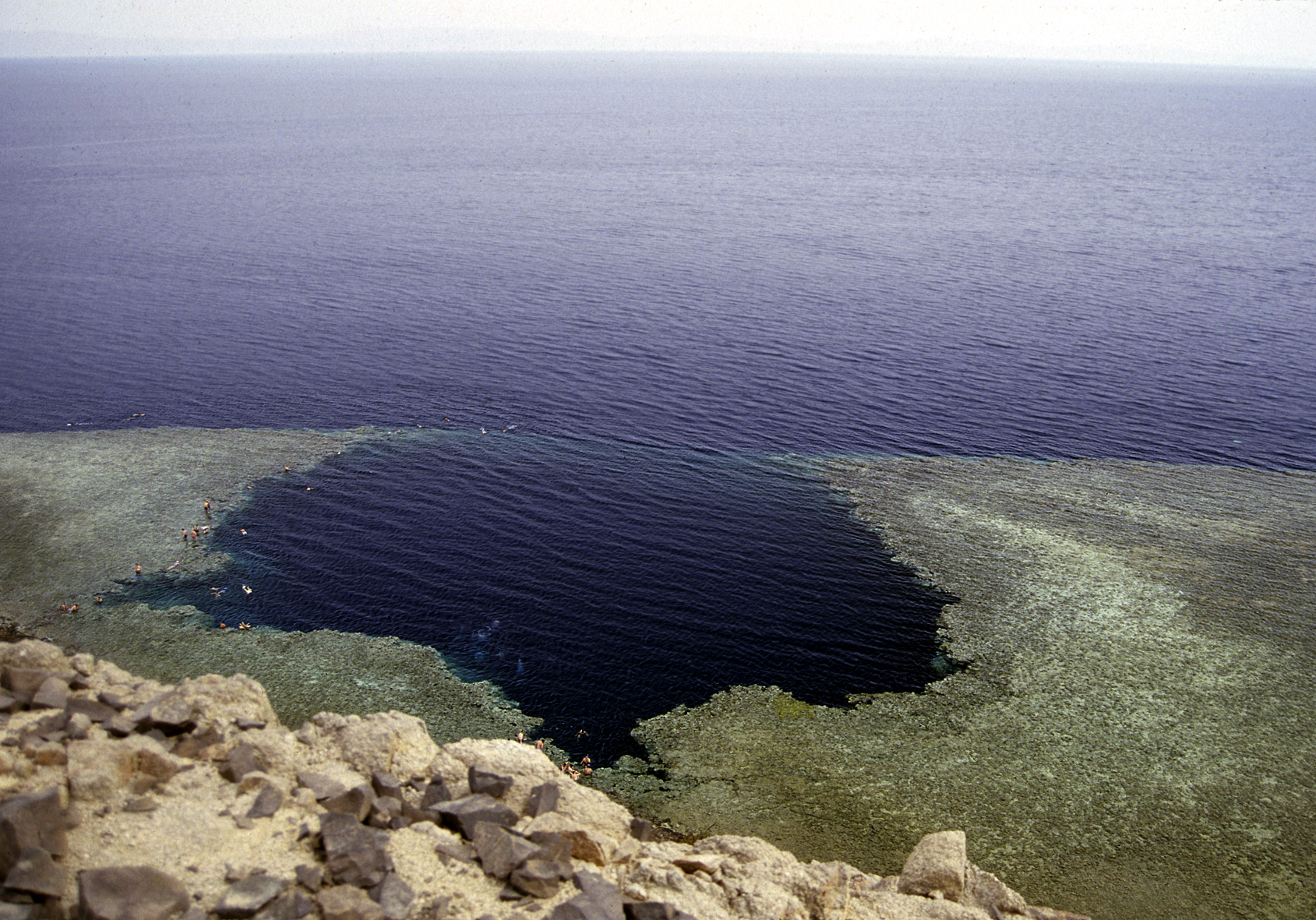
The Blue Hole in Dahab, Egypt, a world-renowned recreational dive site

The common term for a place at which one may dive is a dive site. As a general rule, professional diving is done where the work needs to be done, and recreational diving is done where conditions are suitable. There are many recorded and publicised recreational dive sites which are known for their convenience, points of interest, and frequently favourable conditions. Diver training facilities for both professional and recreational divers generally use a small range of dive sites which are familiar and convenient, and where conditions are predictable and the environmental risk is relatively low.

== Diving procedures ==
Due to the inherent risks of the environment and the necessity to operate the equipment correctly, both under normal conditions and during incidents where failure to respond appropriately and quickly can have fatal consequences, standardised procedures are used in preparation of the equipment, preparation to dive, during the dive if all goes according to plan, after the dive, and in the event of a reasonably foreseeable contingency. The standard procedures are not necessarily the only course of action that will have a satisfactory outcome, but they are generally procedures which have been found by experiment and experience to work well and reliably when applied in response to the given circumstances. All formal diver training is based on the learning of standardised skills and procedures, and in many cases the over-learning of critical skills until the procedures can be performed without hesitation even when distracting circumstances exist. Where reasonably practicable, checklists may be used to ensure that preparatory procedures are carried out in the correct sequence and that no steps are inadvertently omitted.

Some procedures are common to all manned modes of diving, but most are specific to the mode of diving and many are specific to the equipment in use. Diving procedures are those which are directly relevant to diving safety and efficiency, but do not include task specific skills. Standard procedures are particularly helpful where communication is by hand or rope signal – the hand and line signals are examples of standard procedures themselves – as the communicating parties have a better idea of what the other is likely to do in response. Where voice communication is available, standardised communications protocol reduces the time needed to convey necessary information and the error rate in transmission.

Diving procedures generally involve the correct application of the appropriate diving skills in response to the current circumstances, and range from selecting and testing equipment to suit the diver and the dive plan, to the rescue of oneself or another diver in a life-threatening emergency. In many cases, what might be a life-threatening emergency to an untrained or inadequately skilled diver, is a mere annoyance and minor distraction to a skilled diver who applies the correct procedure without hesitation. Professional diving operations tend to adhere more rigidly to standard operating procedures than recreational divers, who are not legally or contractually obliged to follow them, but the prevalence of diving accidents is known to be strongly correlated to human error, which is more common in divers with less training and experience. The Doing It Right philosophy of technical diving is strongly supportive of common standard procedures for all members of a dive team, and prescribes the procedures and equipment configuration which may affect procedures to the members of their organisations.

The terms diving skills and diving procedures are largely interchangeable, but a procedure may require the ordered application of several skills, and is a broader term. A procedure may also conditionally branch or require repeated applications of a skill, depending on circumstances. Diver training is structured around the learning and practice of standard procedures until the diver is assessed as competent to apply them reliably in reasonably foreseeable circumstances, and the certification issued limits the diver to environments and equipment that are compatible with their training and assessed skill levels. The teaching and assessment of diving skills and procedures is often restricted to registered instructors, who have been assessed as competent to teach and assess those skills by the certification or registration agency, who take the responsibility of declaring the diver competent against their assessment criteria. The teaching and assessment of other task oriented skills does not generally require a diving instructor.

There is considerable difference in the diving procedures of professional divers, where a diving team with formally appointed members in specific roles and with recognised competence is required by law, and recreational diving, where in most jurisdictions the diver is not constrained by specific laws, and in many cases is not required to provide any evidence of competence.

== Diver training ==
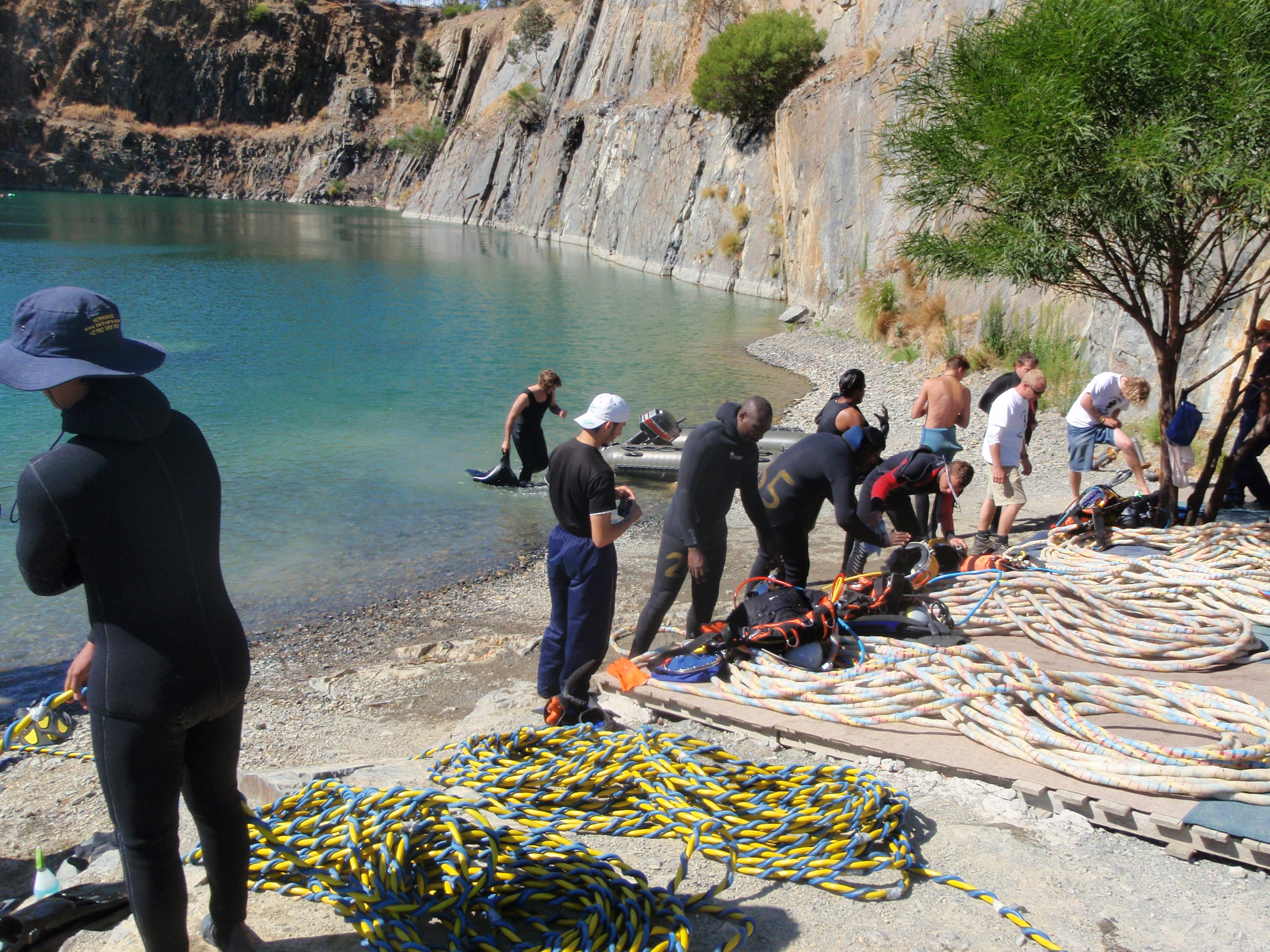
Commercial diver training in a flooded quarry

Underwater diver training is normally given by a qualified instructor who is a member of one of many diver training agencies or is registered with a government agency. Basic diver training entails the learning of skills required for the safe conduct of activities in an underwater environment, and includes procedures and skills for the use of diving equipment, safety, emergency self-help and rescue procedures, dive planning, and use of dive tables. Diving hand signals are used to communicate underwater. Professional divers will also learn other methods of communication.

An entry level diver must learn the techniques of breathing underwater through a demand regulator, including clearing it of water and recovering it if dislodged from the mouth, and clearing the mask if it is flooded. These are critical survival skills, and if not competent the diver is at a high risk of drowning. A related skill is sharing breathing gas with another diver, both as the donor and the recipient. This is usually done with a secondary demand valve carried for this purpose. Technical and professional divers will also learn how to use a backup gas supply carried in an independent scuba set, known as the emergency gas supply or bailout cylinder.

To avoid injury during descent, divers must be competent at equalising the ears, sinuses and mask; they must also learn not to hold their breath while ascending, to avoid barotrauma of the lungs. The speed of ascent must be controlled to avoid decompression sickness, which requires buoyancy control skills. Good buoyancy control and trim also allow the diver to manoeuvre and move about safely, comfortably and efficiently, using swimfins for propulsion.

Some knowledge of physiology and the physics of diving is considered necessary by most diver certification agencies, as the diving environment is alien and relatively hostile to humans. The physics and physiology knowledge required is fairly basic, and helps the diver to understand the effects of the diving environment so that informed acceptance of the associated risks is possible. The physics mostly relates to gases under pressure, buoyancy, heat loss, and light underwater. The physiology relates the physics to the effects on the human body, to provide a basic understanding of the causes and risks of barotrauma, decompression sickness, gas toxicity, hypothermia, drowning and sensory variations. More advanced training often involves first aid and rescue skills, skills related to specialised diving equipment, and underwater work skills. Further training is required to develop the skills necessary for diving in a wider range of environments, with specialised equipment, and to become competent to perform a variety of underwater tasks.

== Medical aspects of diving ==
The medical aspects of diving and hyperbaric exposure include examination of divers to establish medical fitness to dive, diagnosis and treatment of diving disorders, treatment by recompression and hyperbaric oxygen therapy, toxic effects of gases in a hyperbaric environment, and treatment of injuries incurred while diving which are not directly associated with immersion, depth, or pressure.

=== Fitness to dive ===
Medical fitness to dive is the medical and physical suitability of a diver to function safely in the underwater environment using underwater diving equipment and procedures. As a general principle, fitness to dive is dependent on the absence of conditions which would constitute an unacceptable risk for the diver, and for professional divers, to any member of the diving team. General physical fitness requirements are also often specified by a certifying agency, and are usually related to ability to swim and perform the activities that are associated with the relevant type of diving. The general hazards of diving are much the same for recreational divers and professional divers, but the risks vary with the diving procedures used. These risks are reduced by appropriate skills and equipment. Medical fitness to dive generally implies that the diver has no known medical conditions that limit the ability to do the job or jeopardise the safety of the diver or the team, that might get worse as a consequence of diving, or unacceptably predispose the diver to diving or occupational illness.

Depending on the circumstances, fitness to dive may be established by a signed statement by the diver that he or she does not suffer from any of the disqualifying conditions and is able to manage the ordinary physical requirements of diving, by a detailed medical examination by a physician registered as a medical examiner of divers following a prescribed procedural checklist, attested by a legal document of fitness to dive issued by the medical examiner and recorded on a national database, or by alternatives between these extremes.

Psychological fitness to dive is not normally evaluated before recreational or commercial diver training, but can influence the safety and success of a diving career.

=== Diving medicine ===
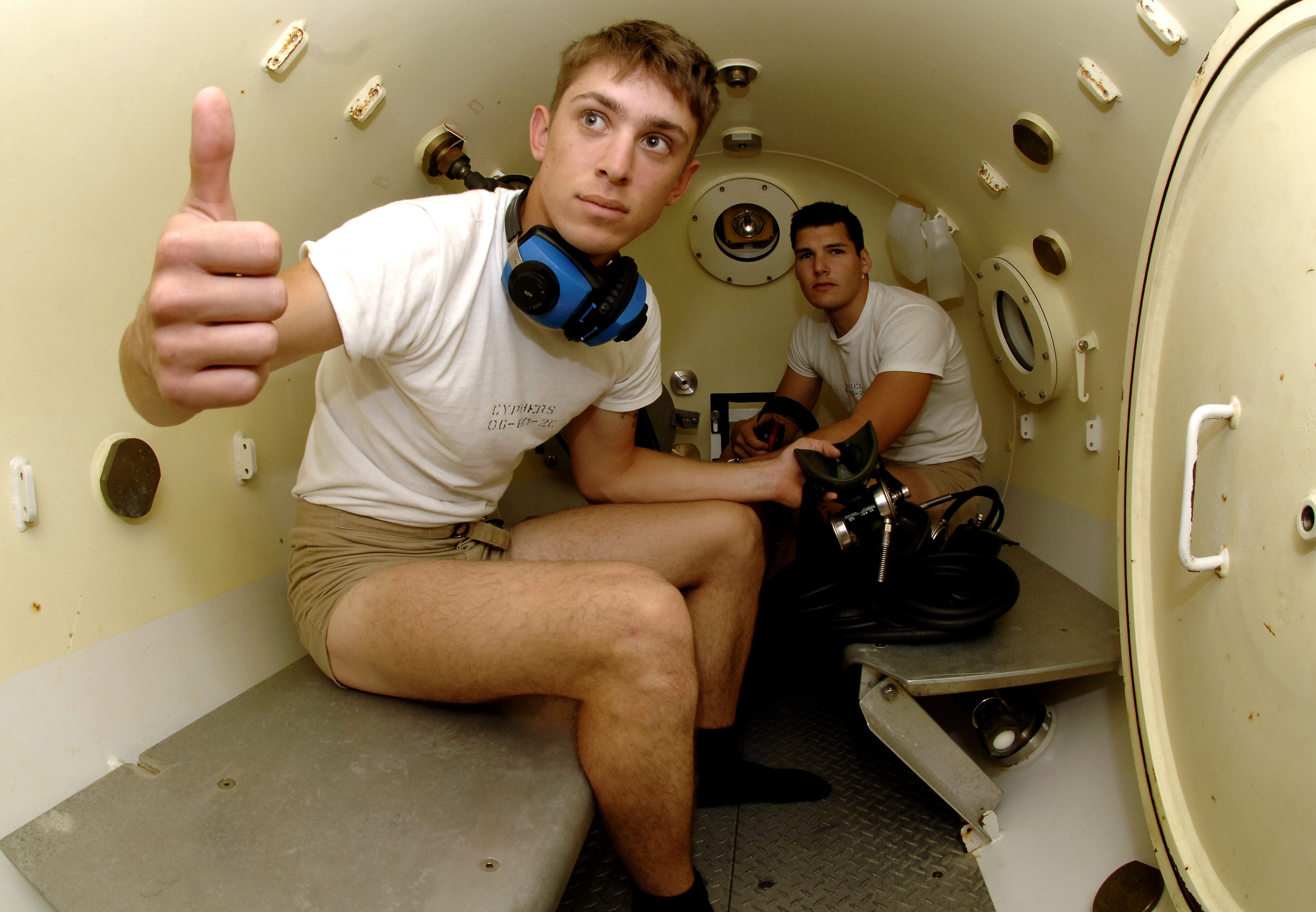
Military and commercial divers are trained in the procedures for use of a recompression chamber to treat diving disorders.

Diving medicine is the diagnosis, treatment and prevention of conditions caused by exposing divers to the underwater environment. It includes the effects of pressure on gas filled spaces in and in contact with the body, and of partial pressures of breathing gas components, the diagnosis and treatment of conditions caused by marine hazards and how fitness to dive and the side effects of drugs used to treat other conditions affects a diver's safety. Hyperbaric medicine is another field associated with diving, since recompression in a hyperbaric chamber with hyperbaric oxygen therapy is the definitive treatment for two of the most important diving-related illnesses, decompression sickness and arterial gas embolism.

Diving medicine deals with medical research on issues of diving, the prevention of diving disorders, treatment of diving accident injuries and diving fitness. The field includes the effect on the human body of breathing gases and their contaminants under high pressure, and the relationship between the state of physical and psychological health of the diver and safety. In diving accidents it is common for multiple disorders to occur together and interact with each other, both causatively and as complications. Diving medicine is a branch of occupational medicine and sports medicine, and first aid and recognition of symptoms of diving disorders are important parts of diver education.

== Risks and safety ==
The international code flag "Alpha", meaning: "I have a diver down; keep well clear at slow speed" (top); alternative "Diver down" flag in common use in the United States and Canada (bottom)

Risk is a combination of hazard, vulnerability and likelihood of occurrence, which can be the probability of a specific undesirable consequence of a hazard, or the combined probability of undesirable consequences of all the hazards of an activity.

The presence of a combination of several hazards simultaneously is common in diving, and the effect is generally increased risk to the diver, particularly where the occurrence of an incident due to one hazard triggers other hazards with a resulting cascade of incidents. Many diving fatalities are the result of a cascade of incidents overwhelming the diver, who should be able to manage any single reasonably foreseeable incident and its probable direct consequences.

Commercial diving operations may expose the diver to more and sometimes greater hazards than recreational diving, but the associated occupational health and safety legislation is less tolerant of risk than recreational, particularly technical divers, may be prepared to accept. Commercial diving operations are also constrained by the physical realities of the operating environment, and expensive engineering solutions are often necessary to control risk. A formal hazard identification and risk assessment is a standard and required part of the planning for a commercial diving operation, and this is also the case for offshore diving operations. The occupation is inherently hazardous, and great effort and expense are routinely incurred to keep the risk within an acceptable range. The standard methods of reducing risk are followed where possible.

Statistics on injuries related to commercial diving are normally collected by national regulators. In the UK the Health and Safety Executive (HSE) is responsible for the overview of about 5,000 commercial divers; in Norway the corresponding authority is the Petroleum Safety Authority Norway (PSA), which has maintained the DSYS database since 1985, gathering statistics on over 50,000 diver-hours of commercial activity per year. The risks of dying during recreational, scientific or commercial diving are small, and for scuba diving, deaths are usually associated with poor gas management, poor buoyancy control, equipment misuse, entrapment, rough water conditions and pre-existing health problems. Some fatalities are inevitable and caused by unforeseeable situations escalating out of control, but the majority of diving fatalities can be attributed to human error on the part of the victim. During 2006 to 2015 there were an estimated 306 million recreational dives made by US residents and 563 recreational diving deaths from this population. The fatality rate was 1.8 per million recreational dives, and 47 deaths for every 1000 emergency department presentations for scuba injuries.

Scuba diving fatalities have a major financial impact by way of lost income, lost business, insurance premium increases and high litigation costs. Equipment failure is rare in open circuit scuba, and when the cause of death is recorded as drowning, it is usually the consequence of an uncontrollable series of events in which drowning is the endpoint because it occurred in water, while the initial cause remains unknown. Where the triggering event is known, it is most commonly a shortage of breathing gas, followed by buoyancy problems. Air embolism is also frequently cited as a cause of death, often as a consequence of other factors leading to an uncontrolled and badly managed ascent, occasionally aggravated by medical conditions. About a quarter of diving fatalities are associated with cardiac events, mostly in older divers. There is a fairly large body of data on diving fatalities, but in many cases the data are poor due to the standard of investigation and reporting. This hinders research which could improve diver safety.

Artisanal fishermen and gatherers of marine organisms in less developed countries may expose themselves to relatively high risk using diving equipment if they do not understand the physiological hazards, particularly if they use inadequate equipment.

=== Diving hazards ===
Divers operate in an environment for which the human body is not well suited. They face special physical and health risks when they go underwater or use high pressure breathing gas. The consequences of diving incidents range from merely annoying to rapidly fatal, and the result often depends on the equipment, skill, response and fitness of the diver and diving team. The hazards include the aquatic environment, the use of breathing equipment in an underwater environment, exposure to a pressurised environment and pressure changes, particularly pressure changes during descent and ascent, and breathing gases at high ambient pressure. Diving equipment other than breathing apparatus is usually reliable, but has been known to fail, and loss of buoyancy control or thermal protection can be a major burden which may lead to more serious problems. There are also hazards of the specific diving environment, which include strong water movement and local pressure differentials, and hazards related to access to and egress from the water, which vary from place to place, and may also vary with time. Hazards inherent in the diver include pre-existing physiological and psychological conditions and the personal behaviour and competence of the individual. For those pursuing other activities while diving, there are additional hazards of task loading, of the dive task and of special equipment associated with the task.

=== Human factors ===
The major factors influencing diving safety are the environment, the diving equipment and the performance of the diver and the dive team. The underwater environment is alien, both physically and psychologically stressful, and usually not amenable to control, though divers can be selective of the conditions in which they are willing to dive. The other factors must be controlled to mitigate the overall stress on the diver and allow the dive to be completed in acceptable safety. The equipment is critical to diver safety for life support, but is generally reliable, controllable and predictable in its performance.

Human factors are the physical or cognitive properties of individuals, or social behaviour specific to humans, which influence functioning of technological systems as well as human-environment equilibrium. Human error is inevitable and everyone makes mistakes at some time, and the consequences of these errors are varied and depend on many factors. Most errors are minor and do not cause harm, but in a high risk environment, such as in diving, errors are more likely to have catastrophic consequences. Examples of human error leading to accidents are available in vast numbers, as it is the direct cause of 60% to 80% of all accidents. Human error and panic are considered to be the leading causes of diving accidents and fatalities. A study by William P. Morgan indicates that over half of all divers in the survey had experienced panic underwater at some time during their diving career, and these findings were independently corroborated by a survey that suggested 65% of recreational divers have panicked under water. Panic frequently leads to errors in a diver's judgement or performance, and may result in an accident. The safety of underwater diving operations can be improved by reducing the frequency of human error and the consequences when it does occur.

Only 4.46% of the recreational diving fatalities in a 1997 study were attributable to a single contributory cause. The remaining fatalities probably arose as a result of a progressive sequence of events involving two or more procedural errors or equipment failures, and since procedural errors are generally avoidable by a well-trained, intelligent and alert diver, working in an organised structure, and not under excessive stress, it was concluded that the low accident rate in professional scuba diving is due to this factor. The study also concluded that it would be impossible to eliminate all minor contraindications of scuba diving, as this would result in overwhelming bureaucracy and bring all diving to a halt.

Human factors in diving equipment design is the influence of the interaction between the diver and the equipment on the design of the equipment on which the diver relies to stay alive and in reasonable comfort, and to perform the planned tasks during a dive. The design of the equipment can strongly influence its effectiveness in performing the desired functions. Divers vary considerably in anthropometric dimensions, physical strength, joint flexibility, and other physiological characteristics within the range of acceptable fitness to dive. Diving equipment should allow as full a range of function as reasonably practicable, and should be matched to the diver, the environment, and the task. Diving support equipment is usually shared by a wide range of divers, and must work for them all.

The most difficult stages of a dive for recreational divers are out of water activities and transitions between water and the surface site such as carrying equipment on shore, exiting from water to boat and shore, surface swimming, and dressing into the equipment. Safety and reliability, adjustability to fit the individual, performance, and simplicity were rated the most important features for diving equipment by recreational divers. The professional diver is supported by a surface team, who are available to assist with the out-of-water activities to the extent necessary to reduce the risk associated with them to a level acceptable in terms of the governing regulations and codes of practice.

=== Risk management ===
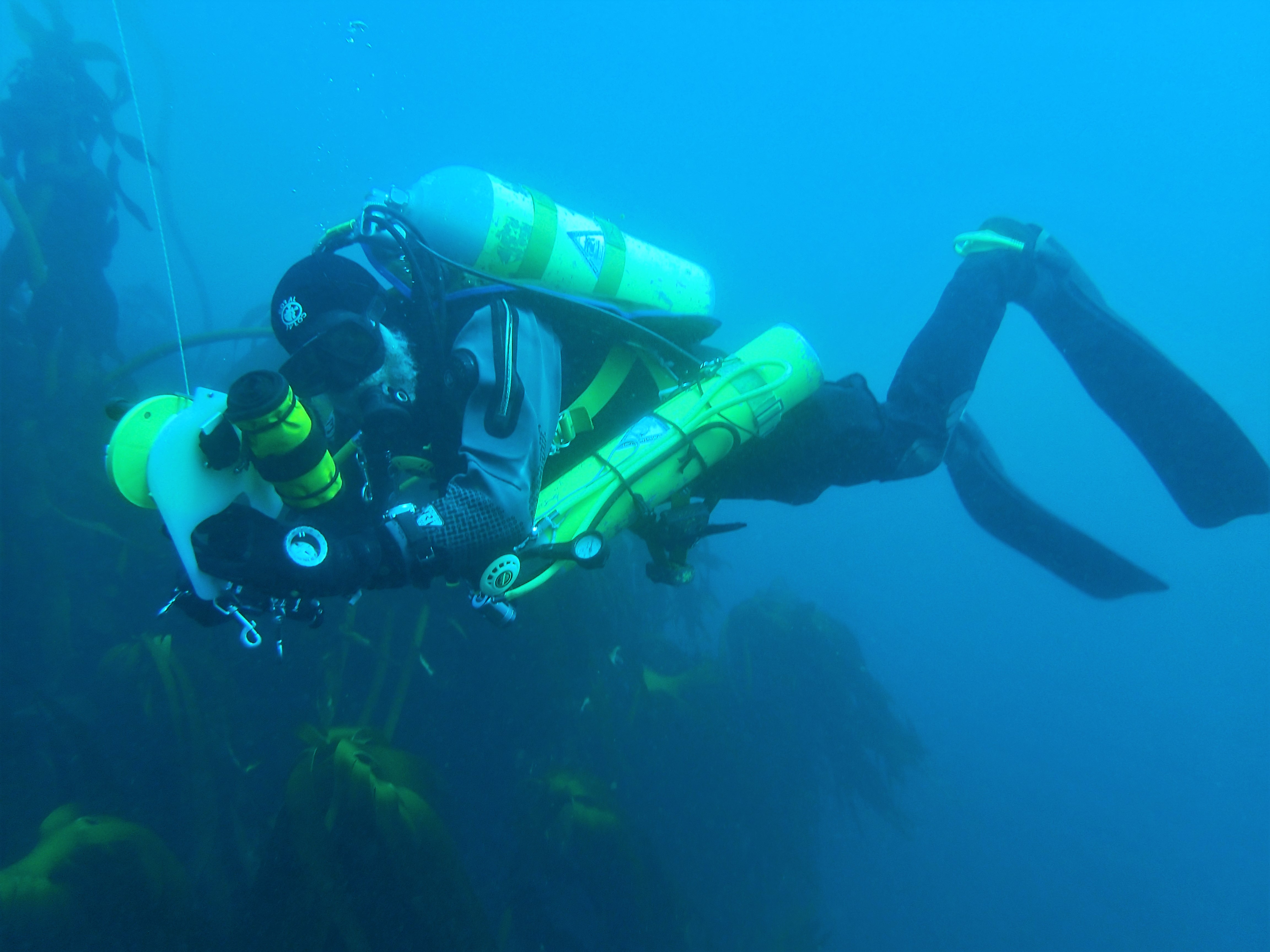
Solo diver managing risk of breathing gas supply failure by carrying a bailout cylinder (slung at the diver's left side)

Risk management of diving operations involves the usual measures of engineering controls, (Note: Engineering methods control the hazard at its source. When feasible, the work environment and the job itself are designed to eliminate hazards or reduce exposure to hazards: If feasible, the hazard is removed or substituted by something that is not hazardous. If removal is not feasible, the hazard is enclosed to prevent exposure during normal operations. Where complete enclosure is not feasible, barriers are established to limit exposure during normal operations.) administrative controls and procedures, (Note: Safe work practices, appropriate training, medical screening and limiting exposure by rotation of workers, breaks and limits on shift length are forms of administrative controls. They are intended to limit the effect of the hazard on the worker when it cannot be eliminated.) and personal protective equipment, (Note: Personal protective clothing and equipment are required in diving operations as exposure to the inherent hazards cannot be engineered out of normal operations, and safe work practices and management controls cannot provide sufficient protection from exposure. Personnel protective controls assume the hazard will be present and the equipment will prevent injury to those exposed.) including hazard identification and risk assessment (HIRA), protective equipment, medical screening, training and standardised procedures. Professional divers are generally legally obliged to carry out and formally record these measures, and though recreational divers are not legally required to do many of them, competent recreational divers, and particularly technical divers, generally perform them informally but routinely, and they are an important part of technical diver training. For example, a medical statement or examination for fitness, pre-dive site assessment and briefing, safety drills, thermal protection, equipment redundancy, alternative air source, buddy checks, buddy or team diving procedures, dive planning, use of dive computers to monitor and record the dive profile and decompression status, underwater hand signals, and carrying first aid and oxygen administration equipment are all routinely part of technical diving.

== Legal aspects ==
Inshore and inland commercial and military diving is regulated by legislation in many countries. Responsibility of the employer, client and diving personnel is specified in these cases; offshore commercial diving may take place in international waters, and is often done following the guidelines of a voluntary membership organisation such as the International Marine Contractors Association (IMCA), which publishes codes of accepted best practice which their member organisations are expected to follow.

Recreational diver training and dive leading are industry regulated in some countries, and only directly regulated by government in a subset of them. In the UK, HSE legislation includes recreational diver training and dive leading for reward; in the US and South Africa industry regulation is accepted, though non-specific health and safety legislation still applies. In Israel recreational diving activities are regulated by the Recreational Diving Act, 1979.

The legal responsibility for recreational diving service providers is usually limited as far as possible by waivers which they require the customer to sign before engaging in any diving activity. The extent of duty of care of recreational buddy divers is unclear and has been the subject of considerable litigation. It is probable that it varies between jurisdictions. In spite of this lack of clarity, buddy diving is recommended by recreational diver training agencies as safer than solo diving, and some service providers insist that customers dive in buddy pairs.

== Economic aspects ==
Scuba diving tourism is the industry based on servicing the requirements of recreational divers at destinations other than where they live. It includes aspects of training, equipment sales, rental and service, guided experiences and environmental tourism. Provision of transport to and from dive sites without convenient shore entry may be provided by basic, day excursion, and live-aboard dive boats.

Motivations to travel for scuba diving are complex and may vary considerably during the diver's development and experience. Participation can vary from once off to multiple dedicated trips per year over several decades. The popular destinations fall into several groups, including tropical reefs, shipwrecks and cave systems, each frequented by its own group of enthusiasts, with some overlap. Customer satisfaction is largely dependent on the quality of services provided, and personal communication has a strong influence on the popularity of specific service providers in a region.

Professional diving includes a wide range of applications, of varying economic impact. All of them are in support of specific sectors of industry, commerce, defence, or public service, and their economic impacts are closely related to their importance to the relevant sector, and their effects on the diving equipment manufacturing and support industries. The importance of diving to the scientific community is not well recorded, but analysis of publications shows that diving supports scientific research largely through efficient and targeted sampling.

Most modes of diving are equipment intensive, and much of the equipment is either life-support or specialised equipment for the application. This has led to a manufacturing industry in support of both recreational and professional diving, where developments in one mode often find applications in another. In terms of total numbers of divers, the recreational diving industry has a far larger market, but the costs of equipment and relatively large manning requirements of professional diving make that market substantial in its own right. The international Diving Equipment and Marketing Association, (DEMA), exists to promote the scuba diving and snorkeling industry.

=== Demographics ===
The number of active scuba divers is not recorded systematically, but has been estimated on occasions with varying levels of confidence. One of the problems is the lack of a generally accepted definition of what constitutes an active scuba diver. The situation for freedivers and snorkelers is even less clear, as most freedivers have no qualification registered anywhere.

The Diving Equipment and Marketing Association (DEMA) estimate from 2.5 to 3.5 million active scuba divers in the US and up to 6 million worldwide, about 11 million snorkelers in the US, and about 20 million snorkelers worldwide. The Sports and Fitness Industry Association (SFIA) reported 2,351,000 casual participants, and 823,000 core participants in 2019, also in the US. Divers Alert Network (DAN), reported 2019 membership numbers worldwide: DAN US/Canada, 274,708; DAN Europe, 123,680; DAN Japan, 18,137; DAN World Asia Pacific, 12,163; DAN World Latin America/Brazil, 8,008; DAN South Africa, 5,894.

The active US scuba diving population could be fewer than 1,000,000, possibly as low as 500,000, depending on the definition of active. Numbers outside the US are less clear. This may be compared with PADI worldwide statistics for 2021, in which they claim to have issued more than 28 million diver certifications since 1967.

Entry of non-divers through certification courses also provides an indicator of numbers, though there is no record of whether a diver remains active after certification unless further training is registered. Three training and certification agencies – Professional Association of Diving Instructors (PADI), Scuba Diving International (SDI), and Scuba Schools International (SSI) reported a combined average of 22,325 entry-level certifications per quarter. Estimating the number of active scuba instructors in the US and internationally is also difficult. Over 300 individual certifying agencies train and certify divers, dive leaders, and instructors, but there are also an unknown number of instructors who are registered with more than one agency. PADI reported 137,000 professional members (instructors and divemasters) worldwide in 2019. On the assumption that PADI represents 70% of the market share, the number of instructors globally may be about 195,000.

The American Academy of Underwater Sciences (AAUS) reports 4,500 divers at 150 organisational member scientific diving programmes (2020), and the Centers for Disease Control and Prevention (CDC) and Bureau of Labor Statistics reported 3,380 commercial divers in the US (2018). The number of active public safety divers in the US is also uncertain, but estimated to be between 3,000 and 5,000 in 2019.

== Environmental impact ==
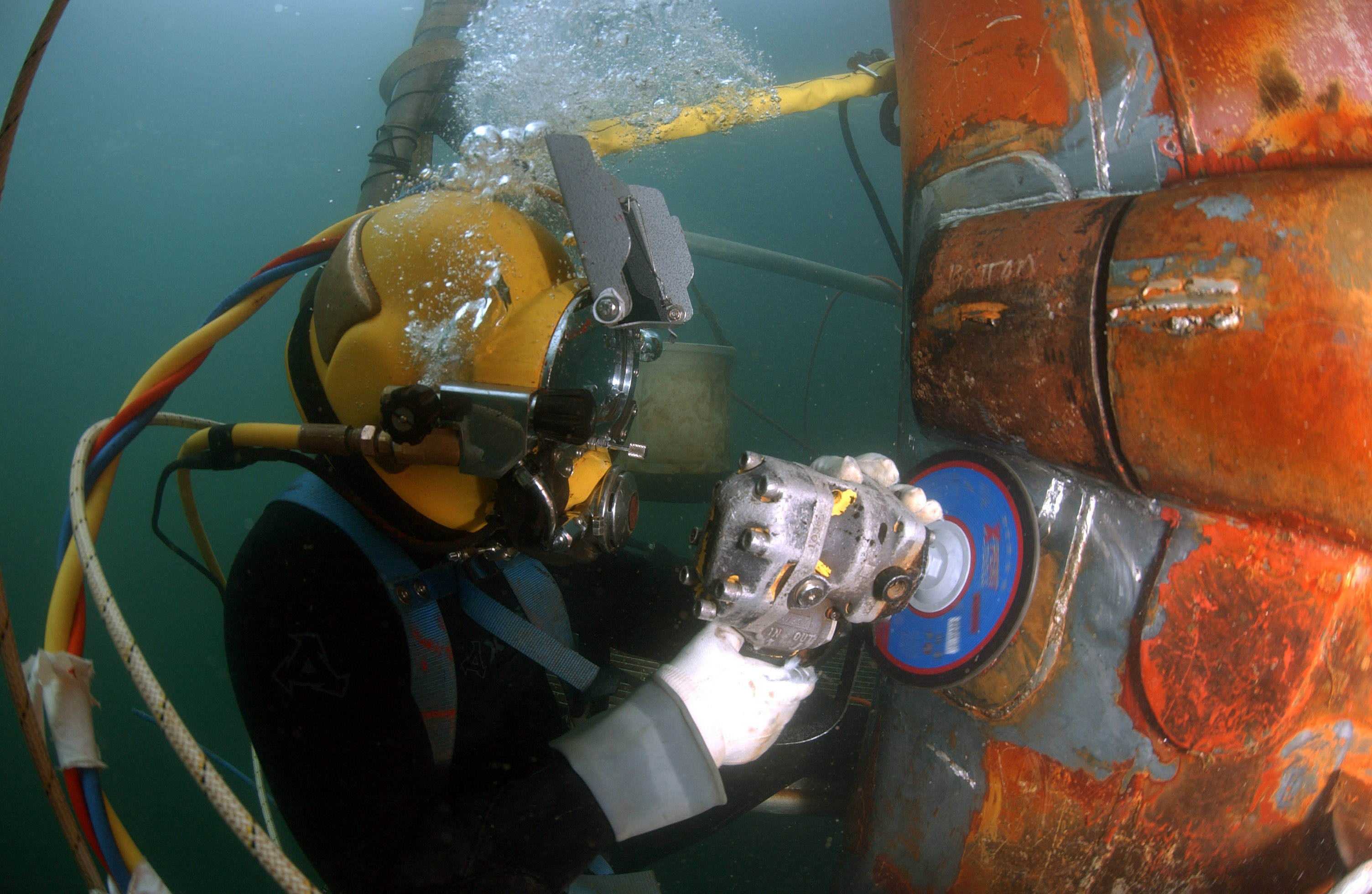
A diver at work on hull maintenance

The environmental impact of recreational diving is the effects of diving tourism on the marine environment. Usually these are considered to be adverse effects, and include damage to reef organisms by incompetent and ignorant divers, but there may also be positive effects as the environment is recognised by the local communities to be worth more in good condition than degraded by inappropriate use, which encourages conservation efforts. During the 20th century recreational scuba diving was considered to have generally low environmental impact, and was consequently one of the activities permitted in most marine protected areas. Since the 1970s diving has changed from an elite activity to a more accessible recreation, marketed to a very wide demographic. To some extent better equipment has been substituted for more rigorous training, and the reduction in perceived risk has shortened minimum training requirements by several training agencies. Training has concentrated on an acceptable risk to the diver, and paid less attention to the environment. The increase in the popularity of diving and in tourist access to sensitive ecological systems has led to the recognition that the activity can have significant environmental consequences.

Recreational scuba diving has grown in popularity during the 21st century, as is shown by the number of certifications issued worldwide, which has increased to about 23 million by 2016 at about one million per year. Scuba diving tourism is a growth industry, and it is necessary to consider environmental sustainability, as the expanding impact of divers can adversely affect the marine environment in several ways, and the impact also depends on the specific environment. Tropical coral reefs are more easily damaged by poor diving skills than some temperate reefs, where the environment is more robust due to rougher sea conditions and fewer fragile, slow-growing organisms. The same pleasant sea conditions that allow development of relatively delicate and highly diverse ecologies also attract the greatest number of tourists, including divers who dive infrequently, exclusively on vacation and never fully develop the skills to dive in an environmentally friendly way. Low impact diving training has been shown to be effective in reducing diver contact.

The ecological impact of commercial diving is a small part of the impact of the specific industry supported by the diving operations, as commercial diving is not done in isolation. In most cases the impact of diving operations is insignificant in comparison with the overall project, and environmental impact assessments may be required before the project is authorised for some classes of project. Underwater ships husbandry may be an exception to this general tendency, and specific precautions to limit ecological impact may be required. Several of these operations will release some quantity of harmful material into the water, particularly hull cleaning operations which will release antifouling toxins. Alien biofouling organisms may also be released during this process. Other forms of professional diving, such as scientific and archaeological dives, are planned to minimise impact, which may be a condition for the application for a permit.
