= Underwater vision =

Ability to see objects underwater

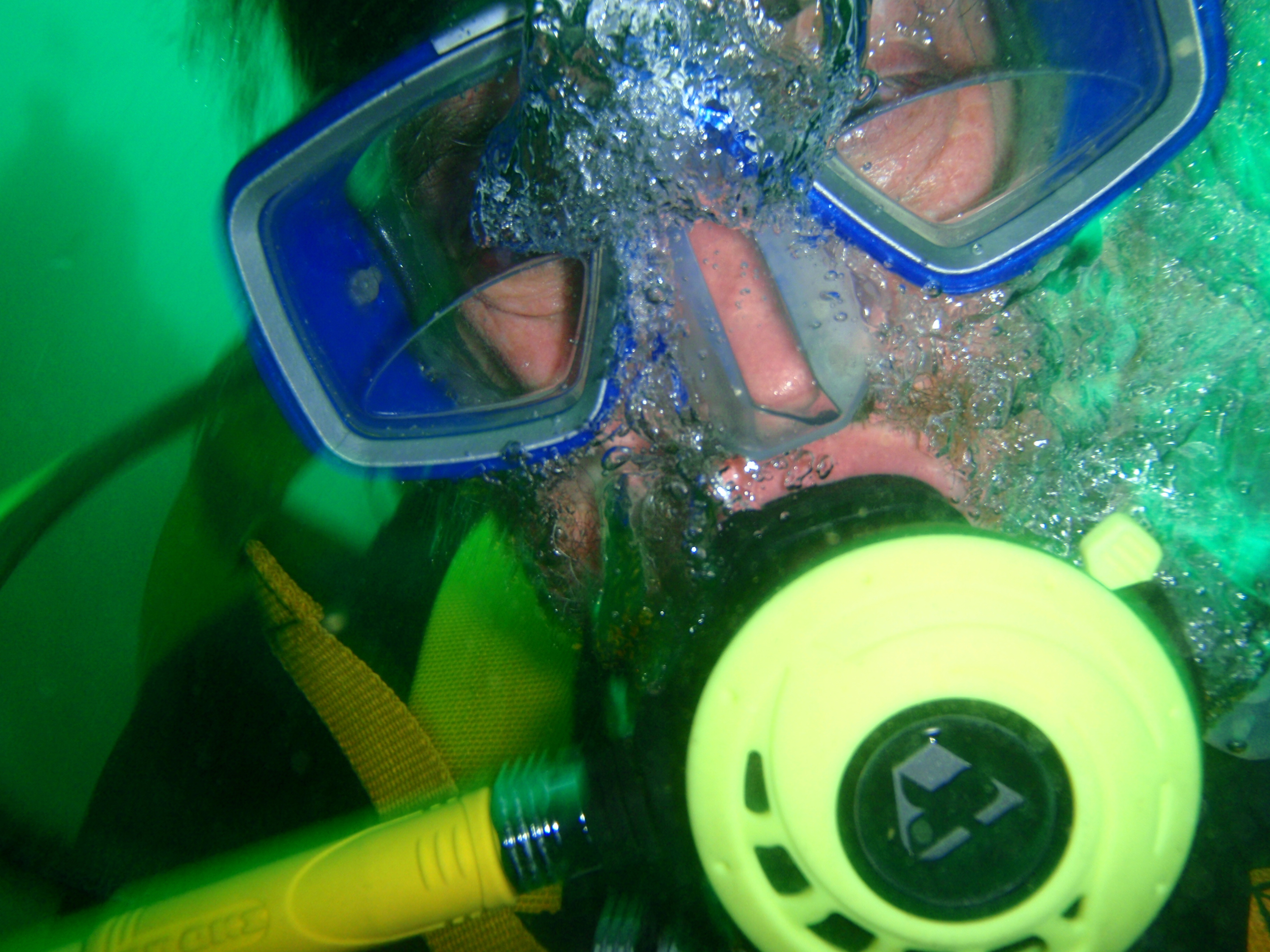
Scuba diver with bifocal lenses fitted to a mask

Underwater vision is the ability to see objects underwater, and this is significantly affected by several factors. Underwater, objects are less visible because of lower levels of natural illumination caused by rapid attenuation of light with distance passed through the water. They are also blurred by scattering of light between the object and the viewer, also resulting in lower contrast. These effects vary with wavelength of the light, and color and turbidity of the water. The vertebrate eye is usually either optimised for underwater vision or air vision, as is the case in the human eye. The visual acuity of the air-optimised eye is severely adversely affected by the difference in refractive index between air and water when immersed in direct contact. Provision of an airspace between the cornea and the water can compensate, but has the side effect of scale and distance distortion. The diver learns to compensate for these distortions. Artificial illumination is effective to improve illumination at short range.

Stereoscopic acuity, the ability to judge relative distances of different objects, is considerably reduced underwater, and this is affected by the field of vision. A narrow field of vision caused by a small viewport in a helmet results in greatly reduced stereoacuity, and associated loss of hand-eye coordination. At very short range in clear water distance is underestimated, in accordance with magnification due to refraction through the flat lens of the mask, but at greater distances - greater than arm's reach, the distance tends to be overestimated to a degree influenced by turbidity. Both relative and absolute depth perception are reduced underwater. Loss of contrast results in overestimation, and magnification effects account for underestimation at short range. Divers can to a large extent adapt to these effects over time and with practice.

Light rays bend when they travel from one medium to another; the amount of bending is determined by the refractive indices of the two media. If one medium has a particular curved shape, it functions as a lens. The cornea, humours, and crystalline lens of the eye together form a lens that focuses images on the retina. The eye of most land animals is adapted for viewing in air. Water, however, has approximately the same refractive index as the cornea (both about 1.33), effectively eliminating the cornea's focusing properties. When immersed in water, instead of focusing images on the retina, they are focused behind the retina, resulting in an extremely blurred image from hypermetropia. This is largely avoided by having an air space between the water and the cornea, trapped inside the mask or helmet.

Water attenuates light due to absorption and as light passes through water colour is selectively absorbed by the water. Color absorption is also affected by turbidity of the water and dissolved material. Water preferentially absorbs red light, and to a lesser extent, yellow, green and violet light, so the color that is least absorbed by water is blue light. Particulates and dissolved materials may absorb different frequencies, and this will affect the color at depth, with results such as the typically green color in many coastal waters, and the dark red-brown color of many freshwater rivers and lakes due to dissolved organic matter.

Visibility is a term which generally predicts the ability of some human, animal, or instrument to optically detect an object in the given environment, and may be expressed as a measure of the distance at which an object or light can be discerned. Factors affecting visibility include illumination, length of the light path, particles which cause scattering, dissolved pigments which absorb specific colours, and salinity and temperature gradients which affect refractive index. Visibility can be measured in any arbitrary direction, and for various colour targets, but horizontal visibility of a black target reduces the variables and meets the requirements for a straight-forward and robust parameter for underwater visibility. Instruments are available for field estimates of visibility from the surface, which can inform the dive team on probable complications.

== Illumination ==
Illumination of underwater environments is limited by the characteristics of the water. Light absorption by water is variable and depends on the temperature of the water and concentration of ions (salinity). Accurate values for the absorption coefficient and the temperature and salinity coefficients are available for specific ranges and values of wavelength from 400nm to 14000nm.There are three dominant molecular vibration modes but the absorption spectrum in liquid water is a continuum. Light scattering is also variable depending on temperature and salinity.

=== Natural illumination ===
Natural illumination underwater comes primarily from sunlight during the day and moonlight at night in the uppermost layer. In deeper regions, where solar light does not penetrate, bioluminescence—light produced by living organisms—provides the primary source of natural illumination. In marine environments, light availability defines five major zones: the epipelagic, mesopelagic, bathypelagic, abyssopelagic, and hadalpelagic zones, in order of least to greatest depth.

- Epipelagic zone(also known as sunlit zone): Extending to a depth of about 200 meters (656 feet), the epipelagic is where most natural light exists. The epipelagic zone is lit up by rays of sunlight that can penetrate roughly 200 meters of depth.
- Mesopelagic zone(also known as twilight zone): Extending from a depth of about 200 meters (656 feet) to 1,000 meters (3,280 feet), is just beyond the reach of most sunlight. The mesopelagic zone receives faint sunlight but is home to bioluminescence—light producing organisms.
- Bathypelagic zone (also known as midnight zone): Extending from a depth of about 1,000-4,000 meters (3,280-13,120 feet), the bathypelagic zone is well beyond the range of sunlight. It is characterized by almost complete darkness broken only by light from bioluminescent organisms.
- Abyssopelagic zone (also known as abyssal zone): Extending from a depth of about 4,000-6,000 meters (13,120-19,690 feet), the abyssopelagic zone is pitch-black but inhabited by bioluminescent organisms. The ocean floor usually lies in this zone.
- Hadalpelagic zone (also known as hadal zone): At a depth of 6,000 meters (19,690 feet) and greater, the hadalpelagic zone is the deepest zone of the ocean, and exists only in trenches such as the Mariana Trench. Similar to the abyssopelagic zone, it is pitch-black and receives light only from bioluminescent organisms.

=== Artificial illumination ===
Artificial illumination refers to illumination by man-made sources such as flashlights and lanterns. Underwater, artificial illumination is generally rare, but its sources are often lights equipped to divers and submersibles.

=== Light absorption and scattering ===
- backscatter has a greater effect when from artificial illumination as the light source is more likely to be close to the viewer than for natural light.

== Evolution of the eye ==
Major stages in the evolution of the eye in vertebrates

Eyes originated, developed and diversified by natural selection as organs of photosensitivity and vision in living organisms. The eye exemplifies convergent evolution of an organ found in many animal forms. Simple light detection is found in bacteria, single-celled organisms, plants and animals. Complex, image-forming eyes have evolved independently several times.

=== Types of eye ===
There are several types of eye, comprising simple eyes, with one concave photoreceptive surface, and compound eyes which include a group of individual lenses laid out over a convex surface. Each of these major types has several lesser variations, with about 10 significant types recognised.

All of these originated in aquatic organisms, and therefore have, at some stages of their evolution, been adapted primarily for underwater vision. Some lineages took to terrestrial life, and their eyes evolved further in that environment, and of those, a few returned to an amphibious or aquatic lifestyle, with further adaptation in some cases.

== Focus ==
Water has a significantly different refractive index to air, and this affects the focusing of the eye. Most animals' eyes are adapted to either underwater or air vision, and do not focus properly when in the other environment.

== Variations by taxa ==
Invertebrates have a large variety of eye structures. Most, possibly all, originated in an aquatic environment, but some have later adapted to a terrestrial environment, and later re-adapted to an aquatic environment. Vertebrates all evolved from a common marine vertebrate ancestor, which already had well developed underwater vision and a specific eye structure, which has been conserved, or in some cases atrophied in animals living in the lightless cave environment.

=== Arthropods ===
Most arthropods have at least one of two types of eye: lateral compound eyes, and smaller median ocelli, which are simple eyes. When both are present, the two eye types are used in concert because each has its own advantage. Ocelli can detect lower light levels, (Note: Ocelli are about 5000 times more sensitive than apposition compound eyes. They can, for instance, respond to the position of the full moon.) and have a faster response time, while compound eyes are better at detecting edges and are capable of forming images.

=== Molluscs ===
The molluscs have the widest variety of eye morphologies of any phylum, and a large degree of variation in their function. Cephalopods such as octopus, squid, and cuttlefish have paired eyes on their heads as complex as those of vertebrates, while scallops have large numbers of simple eyes along the edges of the shell opening, and chitons have a dispersed network of tiny eyes over the surface of their shells which may act together as a compound eye. Many gastropods have stalked eyes which can be retracted in the presence of danger.

There are between seven and eleven distinct eye types in molluscs, of all levels of complexity, from the pit eyes of many gastropods, to the pinhole eyes of the Nautilus, to the lensed eyes of the other cephalopods. Compound eyes are present in some bivalves, and reflective 'mirrors' have been innovated by other lineages such as scallops. The eyes of molluscs also span a large range in size, from 20 μm (0.0008 in) to 27 cm (11 in) across.

=== Fish ===
Fish eyes are similar to the eyes of terrestrial vertebrates like birds and mammals, but the crystalline lenses of fishes' eyes are extremely convex, almost spherical, and their refractive indices are the highest of all the animals. Birds and mammals normally adjust focus by changing the shape of their lens, but fish normally adjust focus by moving the lens closer to or further from the retina. Due to a refractive index gradient within the lens the spherical lenses of fish are able to form sharp images free from spherical aberration.Fish retinas generally have both rod cells and cone cells (for scotopic and photopic vision), and most species have colour vision. Some fish can see ultraviolet and some are sensitive to polarised light.

Among jawless fishes, the lamprey has well-developed eyes, while the hagfish has only primitive eyespots. The ancestors of modern hagfish, thought to be the protovertebrate, were evidently pushed to very deep, dark waters, where they were less vulnerable to sighted predators, and where it is advantageous to have a convex eye-spot, which gathers more light than a flat or concave one. Fish vision shows evolutionary adaptation to their visual environment, for example deep sea fish have eyes suited to the dark environment.

=== Amphibians ===
Amphibians evolved from lobe finned fish, and generally spend the first part of their life cycle in an aquatic environment and the later part in a terrestrial environment. The eyes of amphibians are almost spherical. In anurans, the eye endures changes between stages of life: in the aquatic tadpole stage the lens is spherical and close to the cornea, while in adults it moves posteriorly and becomes flatter.

=== Aquatic vertebrates of terrestrial descent ===
Reptiles, birds and mammals

==== Pinnipeds ====
Monochromatic?

==== Cetaceans ====
Monochromatic?

=== Humans ===
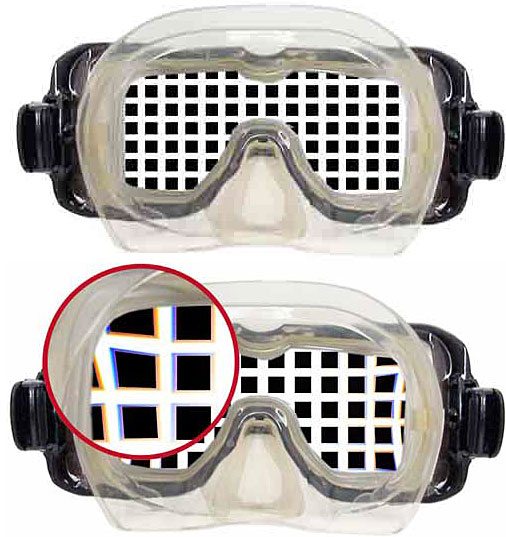
Views through a flat mask, above and below water

The human eye is not adapted for underwater vision, but by wearing a flat diving mask, humans can see clearly underwater. The mask's flat window separates the eyes from the surrounding water by a layer of air. Light rays entering from water into the flat parallel window change their direction minimally within the window material itself. But when these rays exit the window into the air space between the flat window and the eye, the refraction is quite noticeable. The view paths refract (bend) in a manner similar to viewing fish kept in an aquarium. Linear polarizing filters decrease visibility underwater by limiting ambient light and dimming artificial light sources.

While wearing a flat scuba mask or goggles, objects underwater will appear 33% bigger (34% bigger in salt water) or 25% closer than they actually are. Also pincushion distortion and lateral chromatic aberration are noticeable. Double-dome masks restore natural sized underwater vision and field of view, with certain limitations.

==== Optical correction ====
Divers can wear contact lenses under the diving mask or helmet. The risk of loss depends on the security of the mask or helmet, and is very low with a helmet. Framed lenses are available for wear in some helmets and full-face masks, but they can be difficult to defog if there is no fresh, dry, gas flow over them. The frame may be mounted to the helmet or mask, or worn on the head in the usual way, but they cannot be adjusted during a dive if they move out of position.

Glasses worn outside the mask will have different refraction out of the water to underwater, because of the different refractive indices of air and water in contact with the lens surfaces.

Diving masks can be fitted with lenses for divers needing optical correction to improve vision. Corrective lenses are ground flat on one side and optically cemented to the inside face of the mask lens. This provides the same amount of correction above and below the surface of the water as the curved surface of the lens is in contact with air in both cases. Bifocal lenses are also available for this application. Some masks are made with removable lenses, and a range of standard corrective lenses are available which can be fitted. Plastic self-adhesive lenses that can be applied to the inside of the mask may fall off if the mask is flooded for a significant period. Contact lenses may be worn under a mask or helmet, but there is some risk of losing them if the mask floods.

==== Physiological variations ====
A very near-sighted person can see more or less normally underwater. Scuba divers with interest in underwater photography may notice presbyopic changes while diving before they recognize the symptoms in their normal routines due to the near focus in low light conditions.

The Moken people of South-East Asia are able to focus underwater to pick up tiny shellfish and other food items. Gislén et al. have compared Moken and untrained European children and found that the underwater visual acuity of the Moken was twice that of their untrained European counterparts. European children after 1 month of training also showed the same level of underwater visual acuity. This is due to the contraction of the pupil, instead of the usual dilation (mydriasis) that is undergone when a normal, untrained eye, accustomed to viewing in air, is submerged.

== Color vision ==
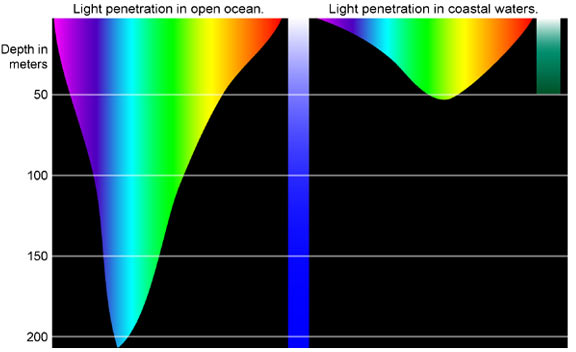
Comparison of penetration of light of different wavelengths in the open ocean and coastal waters

Water attenuates light due to absorption which varies as a function of frequency. In other words, as light passes through a greater distance of water color is selectively absorbed by the water. Color absorption is also affected by turbidity of the water and dissolved material.

Water preferentially absorbs red light, and to a lesser extent, yellow, green and violet light, so the color that is least absorbed by water is blue light. Particulates and dissolved materials may absorb different frequencies, and this will affect the color at depth, with results such as the typically green color in many coastal waters, and the dark red-brown color of many freshwater rivers and lakes due to dissolved organic matter.

Fluorescent paints absorb higher frequency light to which the human eye is relatively insensitive and emit lower frequencies, which are more easily detected. The emitted light and the reflected light combine and may be considerably more visible than the original light. The most visible frequencies are also those most rapidly attenuated in water, so the effect is for greatly increased colour contrast over a short range, until the longer wavelengths are attenuated by the water.

Table of Light Absorption in pure water
Color	Average wavelength	Approximate depth of total absorption
Ultraviolet	300 nm	25 m
Violet	400 nm	100 m
Blue	475 nm	275 m
Green	525 nm	110 m
Yellow	575 nm	50 m
Orange	600 nm	20 m
Red	685 nm	5 m
Infrared	800 nm	3 m

The best colors to use for visibility in water was shown by Luria et al. and quoted from Adolfson and Berghage below:

A. For murky, turbid water of low visibility (rivers, harbors, etc.)

1. With natural illumination:

a. Fluorescent yellow, orange, and red.
b. Regular yellow, orange, and white.

2. With incandescent illumination:

a. Fluorescent and regular yellow, orange, red and white.

3. With a mercury light source:

a. Fluorescent yellow-green and yellow-orange.
b. Regular yellow and white.

B. For moderately turbid water (sounds, bays, coastal water).

1. With natural illumination or incandescent light source:

a. Any fluorescent in the yellows, oranges, and reds.
b. Regular yellow, orange, and white.

2. With a mercury light source:

a. Fluorescent yellow-green and yellow-orange.
b. Regular yellow and white.

C. For clear water (southern water, deep water offshore, etc.).

1. With any type of illumination fluorescent paints are superior.

a. With long viewing distances, fluorescent green and yellow-green.
b. With short viewing distances, fluorescent orange is excellent.

2. With natural illumination:

a. Fluorescent paints.
b. Regular yellow, orange, and white.

3. With incandescent light source:

a. Fluorescent paints.
b. Regular yellow, orange, and white.

4. With a mercury light source:

a. Fluorescent paints.
b. Regular yellow, white.

The most difficult colors at the limits of visibility with a water background are dark colors such as gray or black.

== Visibility ==
Visibility is a term which generally predicts the ability of some human or instrument to detect an object in the given environment, and may be expressed as a measure of the distance at which an object or light can be discerned. The theoretical black body visibility of pure water based on the values for the optical properties of water for light of 550 nm has been estimated at 74 m. For the case of a relatively large object, sufficiently illuminated by daylight, the horizontal visibility of the object is a function of the photopic beam attenuation coefficient (spectral sensitivity of the eye). This function has been reported as 4.6 divided by the photopic beam attenuation coefficient.

Factors affecting visibility include: particles in the water (turbidity), salinity gradients (haloclines), temperature gradients (thermoclines) and dissolved organic matter.

Reduction of contrast with distance in a horizontal plane at a specific wavelength has been found to depend directly on the beam attenuation coefficient for that wavelength. The inherent contrast of a black target is -1, so the visibility of a black target in the horizontal direction depends on a single parameter, which is not the case for any other colour or direction, making horizontal visibility of a black target the simplest case, and for this reason it has been proposed as a standard for underwater visibility, as it can be measured with reasonably simple instrumentation.

The photopic beam attenuation coefficient, on which diver visibility depends, is the attenuation of natural light as perceived by the human eye, but in practice it is simpler and more usual to measure the attenuation coefficient for one or more wavelength bands. It has been shown that the function 4.8 divided by the photopic beam attenuation coefficient, as derived by Davies-Colley, gives a value for visibility with an average error of less than 10% for a large range of typical coastal and inland water conditions and viewing conditions, and the beam attenuation coefficients for a single wavelength band at about 530 nm peak is a suitable proxy for the full visible spectrum for many practical purposes with some small adjustments.

=== Measurement of visibility ===
The standard measurement for underwater visibility is the distance at which a Secchi disc can be seen. The range of underwater vision is usually limited by turbidity. In very clear water visibility may extend as far as about 80m, and a record Secchi depth of 79 m has been reported from a coastal polynya of the Eastern Weddell Sea, Antarctica. In other sea waters, Secchi depths in the 50 to 70 m range have occasionally been recorded, including a 1985 record of 53 m in the Eastern and up to 62 m in the tropical Pacific Ocean. This level of visibility is seldom found in surface freshwater. Crater Lake, Oregon, is often cited for clarity, but the maximum recorded Secchi depth using a 2 m disc is 44 m. The lakes of the McMurdo Dry Valleys of Antarctica and Silfra in Iceland have also been reported as exceptionally clear.

Visibility can be measured in an arbitrary direction, and of various colour targets, but horizontal visibility of a black target reduces the variables and meets the requirements for a straight-forward and robust parameter for underwater visibility, which can be used to make operational decisions for mine hunters and explosive ordnance disposal teams.

An instrument for measuring underwater visibility basically measures light transmission through the water between the target and the observer, to calculate the loss, and is called a transmissometer. By measuring the amount of light which is transmitted from a light source of known strength and wavelength distribution, through a known distance of water to a calibrated light meter, the clarity of water can be objectively quantified. A wavelength of 532 nm (green) aligns well with the peak of the human visual perception spectrum, but other wavelengths may be used. Transmissometers are more sensitive at low particulate concentration and are better suited for measuring relatively clear water.

=== Measurement of turbidity ===
Nephelometers are used for measuring suspended particles in turbid waters where they have a more linear response than transmissometers. Turbidity, or cloudiness, of water is a relative measure. It is an apparent optical property which varies depending on the properties of the suspended particles, illumination, and instrument characteristics. Turbidity is measured in nephelometer units referenced to a turbidity standard or in Formazin Turbidity Units.

Nephelometers measure the light scattered by suspended particles and respond mainly to the first-order effects of particle size and concentration. Depending on manufacturer, nephelometers measure scattered light in the range between about 90° to 165° off the axis of the beam, and usually use infra-red light with a wavelength of around 660 nm because this wavelength is rapidly absorbed by water, so there is very little contamination of the source due to ambient daylight except near to the surface.

=== Low visibility ===
Low visibility refers to a diving environment where the diving medium is turbid and objects cannot be seen clearly at short range even with artificial illumination. The term is not usually used to refer to a simple lack of illumination when the medium is clear. Zero visibility is used to describe conditions when the diver can effectively see nothing outside the mask of helmet, and a light must be put against the viewport to see if it is switched on, and it is not possible for a person with normal vision to read normal instruments. (some mask-integrated head-up displays may be legible)

Low visibility is defined by NOAA for operational purposes as: "When visual contact with the dive buddy can no longer be maintained."

DAN-Southern Africa suggest that limited visibility is when a "buddy cannot be discerned at a distance greater than 3 metres."

== See also ==
- Diving mask – Face cover to improve underwater vision
- Night vision – Ability to see in low light conditions
- Snell's law – Formula for refraction angles
- Underwater computer vision – Subfield of computer vision
- Underwater photography – Genre of photography
