= R3m =

R3m may refer to either of the following space groups in three dimensions:

- R3m, space group number 160
- R3̅m, space group number 166
