= P6 (space group) =

P6 may refer to either of the following space groups in three dimensions:

- P6, space group number 168
- P6̅, space group number 174
