= Hexahydroxybenzene triscarbonate =

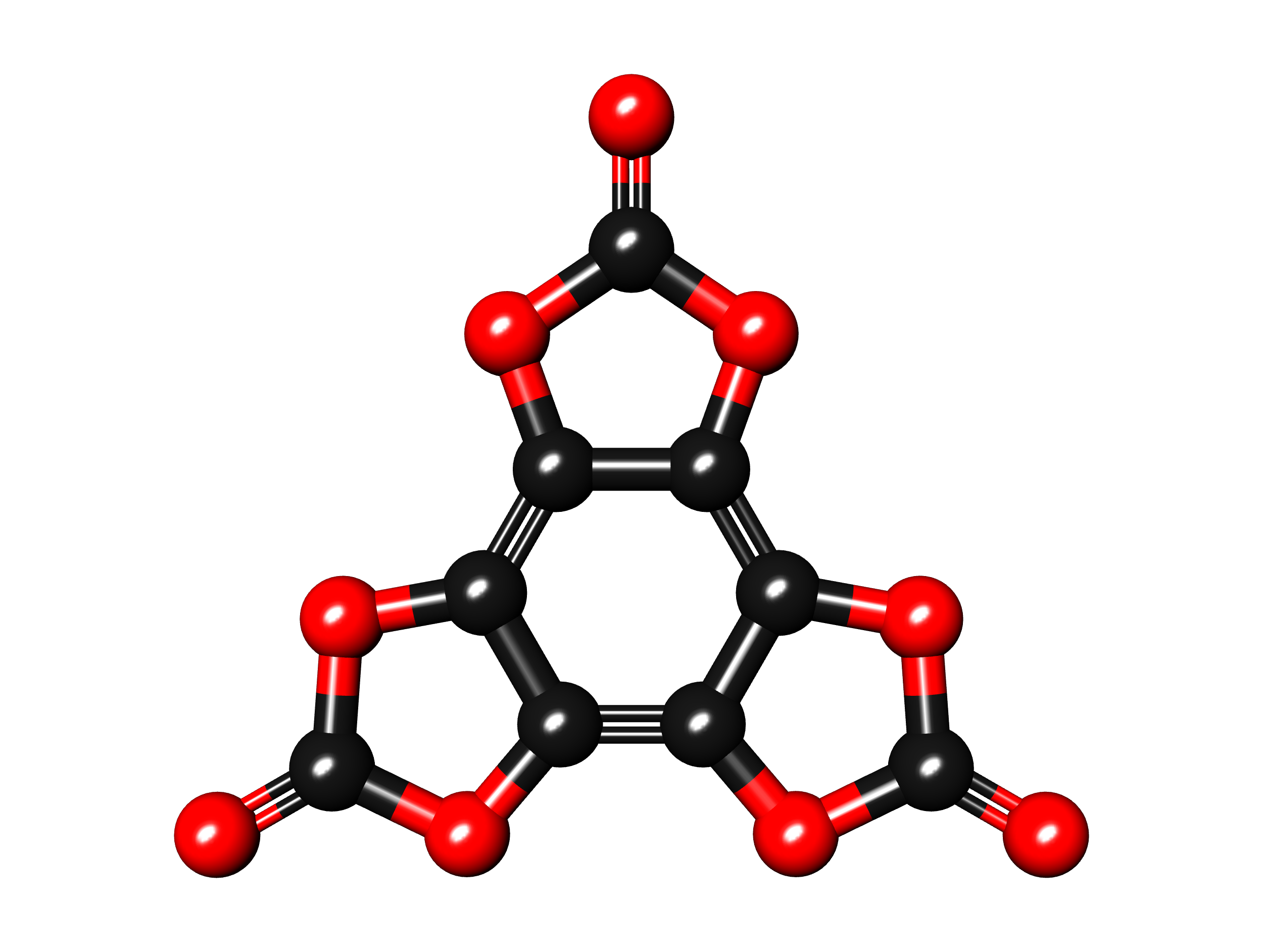

Names
- Preferred IUPAC name 2H,5H,8H-Benzo[1,2-a:3,4-a′:5,6-a′′]tris([1,3]dioxole)-2,5,8-trione

Identifiers
CAS Number	95924-49-5
3D model (JSmol)	Interactive image; Interactive image
ChemSpider	10311361
PubChem CID	13382132
CompTox Dashboard (EPA)	DTXSID501029313
- InChI: InChI=1S/C9O9/c10-7-13-1-2(14-7)4-6(18-9(12)17-4)5-3(1)15-8(11)16-5 Key: ZBAXYMCJUNMJHE-UHFFFAOYSA-N
- SMILES: O=C2Oc3c4OC(=O)Oc4c1OC(=O)Oc1c3O2; O=C2Oc3c4OC(=O)Oc4c1OC(=O)Oc1c3O2

Properties
Chemical formula	C_{9}O_{9}
Molar mass	252.09 g/mol
- Except where otherwise noted, data are given for materials in their standard state (at 25 °C [77 °F], 100 kPa). verify (what is ?) Infobox references

Hexahydroxybenzene triscarbonate is a chemical compound, an oxide of carbon with formula C_{9}O_{9}. Its molecular structure consists of a benzene core with the six hydrogen atoms replaced by three carbonate groups. It can be seen as a sixfold ester of hexahydroxybenzene (benzenehexol) and carbonic acid.

The compound was obtained by C. Nallaiah in 1984, as a tetrahydrofuran solvate.

== See also ==
- Tetrahydroxy-1,4-benzoquinone biscarbonate
- Tetrahydroxy-1,4-benzoquinone bisoxalate
- Hexahydroxybenzene trisoxalate
