= R3c =

R3c may refer to either of the following space groups in three dimensions:

- R3c, space group number 161
- R3̅c, space group number 167
