= P3m1 =

P3m1 may refer to either of the following space groups in three dimensions:

- P3m1, space group number 156
- P3̅m1, space group number 164
