= I4 (space group) =

I4 may refer to either of the following space groups in three dimensions:

- I4, space group number 79
- I4̅, space group number 82
