= R3 (space group) =

R3 may refer to either of the following space groups in three dimensions:

- R3, three-dimensional space group number 146
- R3̅, three-dimensional space group number 148
