= P31m =

P31m may refer to either of the following space groups in three dimensions:

- P31m, space group number 157
- P3̅1m, space group number 162
