= P3c1 =

P3c1 may refer to either of the following space groups in three dimensions:

- P3c1, space group number 158
- P3̅c1, space group number 165
