= Tetrahydroxy-1,4-benzoquinone biscarbonate =

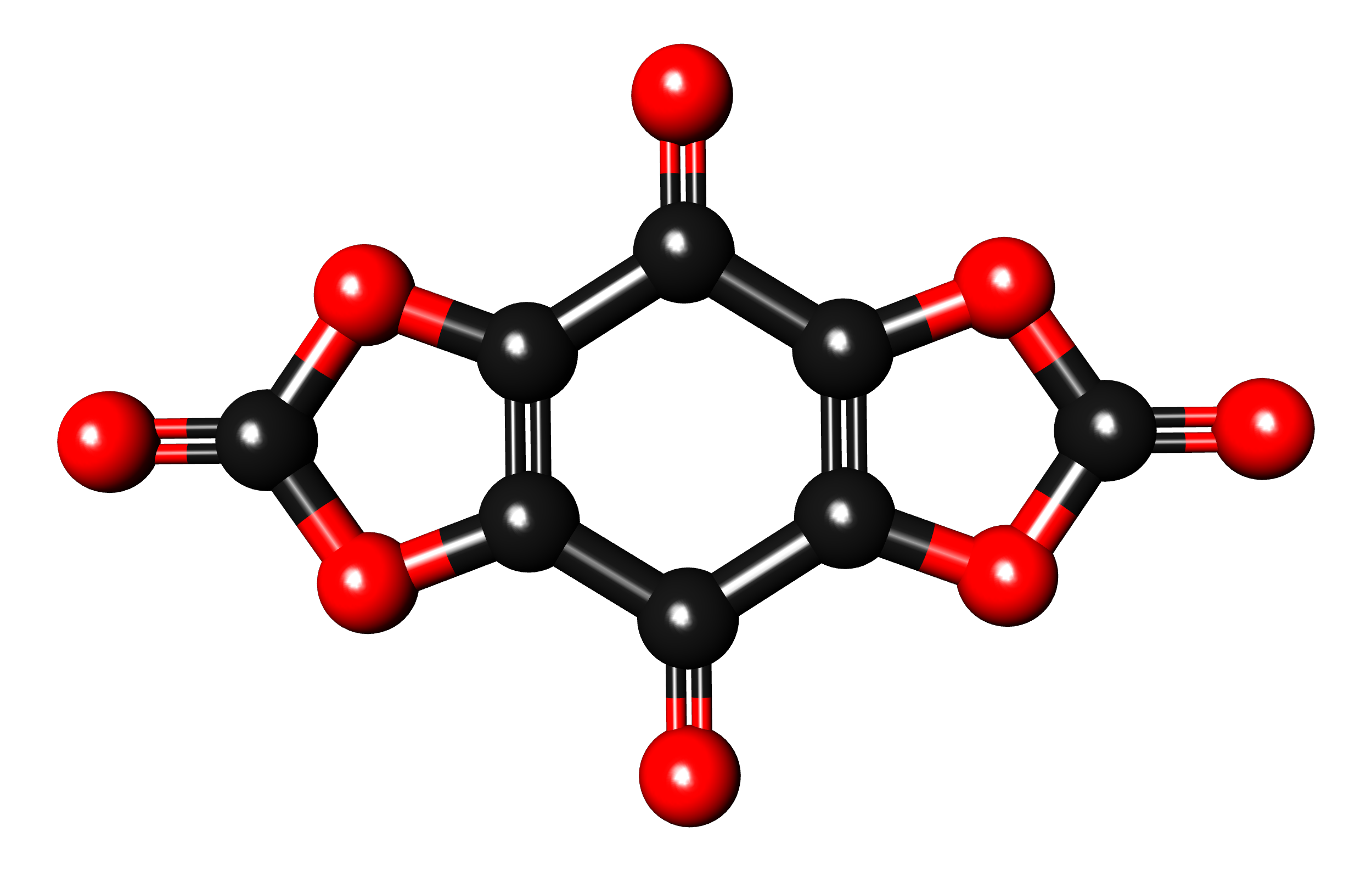

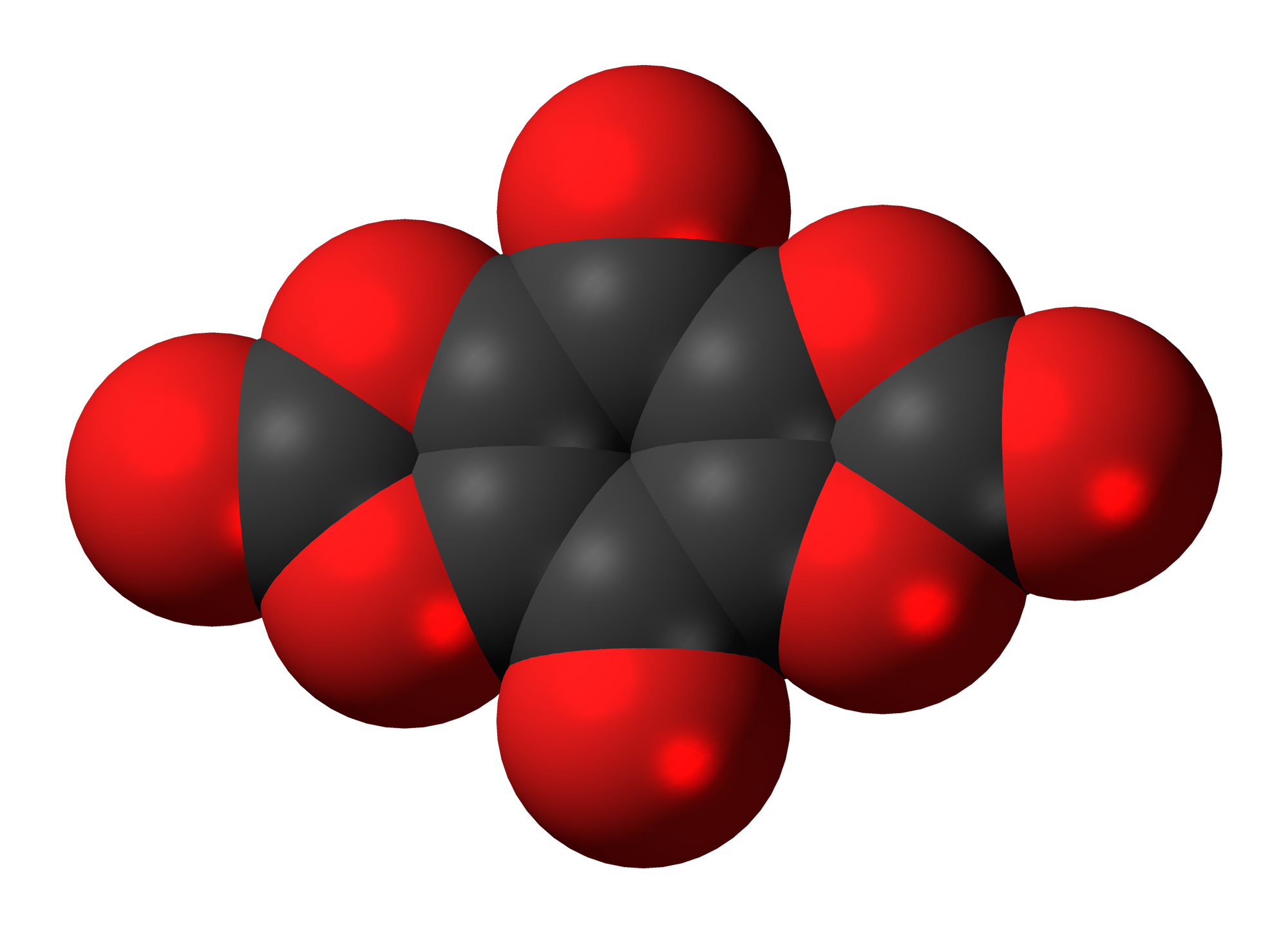

Names
- Preferred IUPAC name 2H,6H-Benzo[1,2-d:4,5-d′]bis([1,3]dioxole)-2,4,6,8-tetrone

Identifiers
3D model (JSmol)	Interactive image
ChemSpider	10311360
PubChem CID	13382131
CompTox Dashboard (EPA)	DTXSID101029311
- InChI: InChI=1S/C8O8/c9-1-3-5(15-7(11)13-3)2(10)6-4(1)14-8(12)16-6 Key: KLJYZROROSJGHR-UHFFFAOYSA-N; InChI=1/C8O8/c9-1-3-5(15-7(11)13-3)2(10)6-4(1)14-8(12)16-6 Key: KLJYZROROSJGHR-UHFFFAOYAF
- SMILES: C12=C(C(=O)C3=C(C1=O)OC(=O)O3)OC(=O)O2

Properties
Chemical formula	C_{8}O_{8}
Molar mass	224.08 g/mol
- Except where otherwise noted, data are given for materials in their standard state (at 25 °C [77 °F], 100 kPa). verify (what is ?) Infobox references

Tetrahydroxy-1,4-benzoquinone biscarbonate is a chemical compound, an oxide of carbon with formula C_{8}O_{8}. Its molecule consists of a 1,4-benzoquinone core with the four hydrogen atoms replaced by two carbonate groups. It can be seen as a fourfold ester of tetrahydroxy-1,4-benzoquinone and carbonic acid.

The compound was obtained by C. Nallaiah in 1984, as a tetrahydrofuran solvate.

== See also ==
- Tetrahydroxy-1,4-benzoquinone bisoxalate
- Hexahydroxybenzene trisoxalate
- Hexahydroxybenzene triscarbonate
