= 40HNU-VI =

Nickel-chromium alloy

40ХНЮ-ВИ (40KhNYu-VI or 40HNU-VI, ЭП793-ВИ or EP793-VI) is a precipitation-hardened alloy of nickel, chromium and aluminum, with a nominal composition of about 57 wt% Ni, 40 wt% Cr and 3 wt% Al. It is distinguished by high strength, low magnetic susceptibility, and neutron-transparency at low temperatures. In particular, it does not contain cobalt, which would turn to the highly radioactive Cobalt-60 under neutron irradiation. The alloy is widely used for the cylinders, pistons and gaskets of non-magnetic high-pressure cells employed in neutron scattering, magnetometry and diamond anvil cell experiments at cryogenic temperatures.

In the high-pressure literature, it is also referred to simply as NiCrAl, Ni−Cr−Al, or "the Russian alloy", since it is only industrially produced in the Soviet Union and then Russia.

== Designation ==
Under the GOST system of Russian alloy nomenclature, the grade name is rendered in Cyrillic as 40ХНЮ: Х stands for chromium, Н for nickel and Ю for aluminum). The suffix -ВИ means вакуумно-индукционный ('Vacuum-Induction-melted') stock.

In the English high-pressure literature, its name is variously transcribed as 40HNU-VI, 40HNYu-VI or 40KhNYu-VI.

It is supplied under the technical specification TU 14-1-2740-79 and the products standards GOST 22411-77 and GOST 2590-2006.

40KhNYu-VI has not been officially designated a superalloy, since its high-temperature creep and oxidation behavior have yet to be characterized in detail.

== Composition ==
The nominal composition reported in the high-pressure literature is 57.0 wt% Ni, 40.0 wt% Cr and 3.0 wt% Al.

For industrial use, TU 14-1-2740-79 specifies the acceptable ranges for the major elements and impurities:

Composition of 40KhNYu-VI per TU 14-1-2740-79 (wt%)
Element	Ni	Cr	Al	Fe	Mn	Si	C	S	P
Content	balance	39–41	3.3–3.8	≤0.6	≤0.1	≤0.1	≤0.03	≤0.01	≤0.01

== Properties ==
=== Phases ===
40KhNYu-VI is precipitation-hardened during production. Quenched from above 1100 °C, the alloy forms a supersaturated face-centered cubic (fcc) solid solution of Cr in Ni. Upon aging at temperatures above ~500 °C, this metastable solid solution decomposes, and precipitates a chromium-rich phase and an ordered intermetallic Ni_{3}Al (γ′). This produces the hardened microstructure.

Cheng et al. (2019) identified three crystalline phases at room temperature by synchrotron X-ray powder diffraction:

- an orthorhombic Ni_{2}Cr-type ordered phase (space group Immm), with about 97 vol% of the material. Its lattice is derived from the parent fcc cell with $a \approx a_{\text{fcc}}/\sqrt{2}, b \approx 3 a_{\text{fcc}}/\sqrt{2}, c \approx a_{\text{fcc}}$.
- a body-centered cubic Cr-type phase (space group Im3̅m), about 0.1 vol%.
- a cubic Ni_{3}Al-type phase (space group Pm3̅m), about 2.9 vol%.

=== Mechanical ===
The quenched solid solution 40KhNYu-VI is precipitation-hardened. Eremets (1996, p. 206) reports a Young's modulus of about 224 GPa for the following room-temperature tensile properties as a function of hardness on the Rockwell C scale (HRC):

Room-temperature mechanical properties of 40KhNYu-VI (Eremets, after Motovilov)
Hardness (HRC)	0.2% Yield strength $\sigma_{0.2}$ (GPa)	Ultimate tensile strength $\sigma_B$ (GPa)	Elongation δ (%)
45–48	1.47	1.57	15–20
64–67 (maximum)	1.96–2.06	2.35	0–3

The TU 14-1-2740-79 specification guarantees, for the standard solution-treated and aged condition (quench from 1140–1160 °C in water followed by aging at 800–840 °C for 12–24 h with air cooling), $\sigma_{0.2}$ ≥ 1.08 GPa, $\sigma_B$ ≥ 1.275 GPa, $\delta_5$ ≥ 10%, reduction of area ≥ 15% and impact toughness ≥ 98 kJ/m² on a 25 mm round bar, with hardness ≤ 45 HRC. An alternative low-temperature aging regime (540–560 °C, 5 h) yields hardness ≥ 57 HRC.

There is an approximately linear correlation between yield strength and Rockwell C hardness, $\sigma_{0.2} \approx 0.0264 \times \mathrm{HRC} + 0.2636~\mathrm{GPa}$. Walker (1999) gives yield strength 2.00 GPa, ultimate tensile strength of 2.10 GPa, elongation ~7%, at room temperature. For practical high-pressure cell construction, hardnesses in the range 50–55 HRC are preferred: the material is sufficiently plastic at this level to be used as a high-pressure liner. Cold work of the quenched alloy prior to aging raises the hardness to 64–67 HRC. This material has essentially no tensile ductility, but performs well in compression, and is used in indenters and pistons.

Cryogenic data for 40KhNYu-VI have not been published, but the alloy is reported to work well at liquid helium temperature. In general, metals with fcc structure show small variation in toughness and ductility as the temperature is reduced. This contrasts with metals with bcc structure, such as mild steel, which transitions from ductile to brittle at a certain temperature.

The electrical resistivity is 80 μΩ·cm at 300 K and 64 μΩ·cm at 4.2 K. The density is about 7.6 g/cm³.

=== Magnetic ===
Despite its high nickel content, 40KhNYu-VI is paramagnetic with no detectable magnetic ordering down to at least 1.9 K, as established by vibrating sample magnetometer measurements and confirmed by polarized-neutron diffraction, in which no magnetic incoherent contribution to the scattering is observed. It is entirely not ferromagnetic. Magnetization depends linearly on field with no hysteresis.The deviation of $1/\chi(T)$ from simple Curie–Weiss behavior suggests an additional contribution beyond pure paramagnetism, possibly of spin glass type.

The mass magnetic susceptibility is reported as $4 \times 10^{-8}~\mathrm{m^3/kg}$ at room temperature and $1 \times 10^{-7}~\mathrm{m^3/kg}$ at 4 K, with an almost flat temperature dependence, a property that makes the alloy attractive for high-field, low-temperature applications.

=== Neutron-scattering ===
Material for high-pressure cells used in neutron scattering experiments needs to satisfy several conditions: high mechanical strength, weak paramagnetism, no neutron activation, and low neutron attenuation. 40KhNYu-VI is considered the best material for this. Cobalt-containing alloys such as MP35N and maraging steels become radioactive under prolonged neutron irradiation.

For 4.74 Å cold neutrons, Cheng et al. (2019) measured a transmission of 47.5% through a 6 mm thickness of 40HNU-VI on the polarized neutron reflectometer at FRM II in Garching. Under the same conditions a beryllium copper sample of equal thickness would transmit 61.7%. 40HNU-VI is therefore less transparent to neutrons than CuBe, but it has superior strength and magnetic properties.

A modification adds boron to improve forgeability, developed by Uwatoko et al. (2002) at the University of Tokyo. It has the composition 56.5 wt% Ni, 40.0 wt% Cr, 3.5 wt% Al and 50 ppm B. In nickel alloys of this kind, boron acts as an interstitial impurity that segregates to the grain boundaries and forms hard boride particles. The boron addition is undesirable for neutron scattering applications unless the boron is isotopically enriched in ^{11}B, because natural-abundance boron contains roughly 20% of the strongly neutron-absorbing isotope ^{10}B. The thermal-neutron absorption cross section of ^{11}B is about 0.0055 barn, against ≈3835 barn for ^{10}B. Klotz (2013, p. 47) suggests such that ^{11}B-modified 40HNU-VI could be used for neutron scattering applications on a wider scale, including to moderately high temperatures.

== History ==
The alloy was developed in the Soviet Union for non-magnetic structural applications. Its earliest reported use in high-pressure equipment was by Alymov and co-workers in 1972, with subsequent characterization and use reported in 1979 by Voronovskii's group and in 1986 by the groups of Bud'ko and Wasilewski.

By the 1990s, 40HNU-VI was recognized by Western high-pressure groups as the best available non-magnetic cell material, but it was unavailable as raw material outside the former Soviet Union and was held in only small quantities by individual Russian high-pressure laboratories from earlier production runs. New productions were supposedly prohibitively expensive, and small-scale Western attempts to reproduce the alloy had resulted in material of very low quality.

In modern Russian industry, the alloy is supplied (under the alternative designation EP793) for non-magnetic, corrosion-resistant precision bearings and other parts of special purpose. It is available in Russia as a raw stock. It is unavailable outside of Russia as a raw stock. New neutron facilities using the alloy are designed and manufactured in Russia and can be shipped abroad.

This motivated reproductions outside Russia:

- Uwatoko et al. (2002) at the University of Tokyo cast a 7 kg ingot under argon, hot-worked it at 1200 °C and aged it at 400–900 °C. Their material reached $\sigma_B$ > 2 GPa at 57 HRC after aging for 2 h at 700 °C. They added approximately 50 ppm of boron to improve forgeability.
- Cheng et al. (2019) at RWTH Aachen University, in collaboration with Forschungszentrum Jülich and the Heinz Maier-Leibnitz Zentrum, cast a 50 kg ingot in an Al_{2}O_{3}−CaO spinel crucible under argon at 1500 °C, deliberately omitting boron so that the material would be usable in neutron scattering. Their alloy achieves hardness in the optimal 52–56 HRC range after a single 2-hour age at 500–750 °C, without the prior solution treatment and water quench step of Uwatoko et al. (2002).

== Applications ==
The principal application of 40KhNYu-VI is in piston-cylinder cells used at neutron-scattering instruments operating at low temperatures and high magnetic fields, where the alloy's strength allows substantially higher pressures than equivalent null-scattering TiZr cells. Such cells routinely reach several gigapascals at cryogenic temperatures In many designs the alloy serves as the inner sleeve of a compound cell, jacketed by beryllium copper for added safety (Be–Cu is more plastic) and lower magnetic permeability.

40HNU-VI is also one of several non-magnetic superalloys evaluated as gasket and component material in diamond anvil cells, where its strength, paramagnetic behavior and cobalt-free composition suit measurements of low-field superconductivity and magnetism at sub-kelvin temperatures.

Independently of high-pressure research, the alloy is supplied under the ЭП793 designation for non-magnetic, corrosion-resistant precision bearings and similar parts.

== See also ==
- Beryllium copper
- Maraging steel
- Inconel
- Diamond anvil cell
- Neutron scattering
