= P31c =

P31c may refer to either of the following space groups in three dimensions:

- P31c, space group number 159
- P3̅1c, space group number 163
