= P4 (space group) =

P4 may refer to either of the following space groups in three dimensions:

- P4, space group number 75
- P4̅, space group number 81
