= P3 (space group) =

P3 may refer to either of the following space groups in three dimensions:

- P3, three-dimensional space group number 143
- P3̅, three-dimensional space group number 147
