= Beryllide =

Beryllide is an intermetallic compound of beryllium with other metals, e.g. zirconium, tantalum, titanium, nickel, or cobalt. Typical chemical formulae are Be_{12}Ti and FeBe_{5}. These are hard, metal-like materials that display properties distinct from the constituents, especially with regard to their resilience toward oxidation.

== Applications and potential applications ==
Beryllides of cobalt and nickel have metallurgical importance as the precipitated phase in beryllium copper alloys. These materials are nonsparking, which allows them to be used in certain hazardous environments.

In nuclear technology, beryllides are investigated as neutron multipliers. Unlike metallic Be, materials such as Be_{12}Ti are more resistant to oxidation by water but retain the neutron-multiplying properties of the predominant isotope ^{9}Be.
