= Carbonic acid =

Chemical compound

- Structural formula

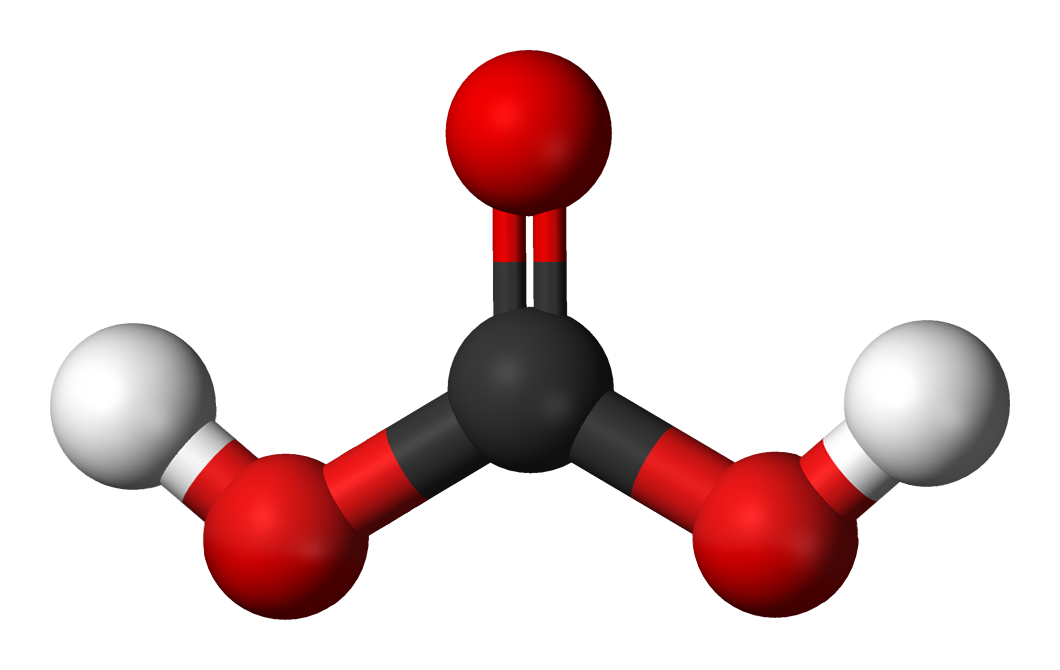
- Ball-and-stick model

Names
- Preferred IUPAC name Carbonic acid
- Other names: Oxidocarboxylic acid; Hydroxyformic acid; Hydroxymethanoic acid; Carbonylic acid; Hydroxycarboxylic acid; Dihydroxycarbonyl; Carbon dioxide solution; Aerial acid; Metacarbonic acid

Identifiers
CAS Number	463-79-6
3D model (JSmol)	Interactive image
ChEBI	CHEBI:28976
ChEMBL	ChEMBL1161632
ChemSpider	747
DrugBank	DB14531
ECHA InfoCard	100.133.015
EC Number	610-295-3
Gmelin Reference	25554
KEGG	C01353
PubChem CID	767
UNII	142M471B3J
CompTox Dashboard (EPA)	DTXSID9043801
- InChI: InChI=1S/CH2O3/c2-1(3)4/h(H2,2,3,4) Key: BVKZGUZCCUSVTD-UHFFFAOYSA-N; InChI=1/H2O3/c2-1(3)4/h(H2,2,3,4) Key: BVKZGUZCCUSVTD-UHFFFAOYAU
- SMILES: O=C(O)O

Properties
Chemical formula	H_{2}CO_{3}
Molar mass	62.024 g·mol^{−1}
Appearance	Colorless gas
Melting point	−53 °C (−63 °F; 220 K) (sublimes)
Boiling point	127 °C (261 °F; 400 K) (decomposes)
Solubility in water	Reacts to form carbon dioxide and water
Acidity (pK_{a})	pK_{a1} = 3.75 (25 °C; anhydrous); pK_{a1} = 6.35 (hydrous); pK_{a2} = 10.33
Conjugate base	Bicarbonate, carbonate

Hazards
NFPA 704 (fire diamond)	0 0 1

Structure
Crystal structure	monoclinic
Space group	p21/c, No. 14
Point group	-
Lattice constant	a = 5.392 Å, b = 6.661 Å, c = 5.690 Å α = 90°, β = 92.66°, γ = 90° (D_{2}CO_{3} at 1.85 GPa, 25 °C (298 K))
Lattice volume (V)	204.12 Å^{3}
Formula units (Z)	4 formula per cell
- Except where otherwise noted, data are given for materials in their standard state (at 25 °C [77 °F], 100 kPa). verify (what is ?) Infobox references

Carbonic acid is a chemical compound with the chemical formula H_{2}CO_{3}. The molecule rapidly converts to water and carbon dioxide in the presence of water. In contrast to early-twentieth century textbooks, numerous studies conducted since ca. 1990 identified H_{2}CO_{3} as a real molecule with a distinct Raman spectrum and with a first-order life-time of ca. 20 ms at 37 °C. More recently, different phases of crystalline hydrated carbonic acid have been obtained at pressures of the order of the gigapascal. Solid anhydrous carbonic acid has also been isolated.

The interconversion of carbon dioxide and carbonic acid is related to the breathing process of all aerobic organisms and to the acidification of natural waters.

== History ==
In the early days of chemistry, CO_{2} was known by several names. Led by Lavoisier, a group of chemists systematized the nomenclature of chemicals then known. CO_{2} was named "carbonic acid" in 1781, because it was produced by the combustion of charcoal (charbon in French), and it was considered an acid. Back then, an acid was something that, when dissolved in water, turned litmus red and had a distinctive acidic taste. Later, chemists reconceptualized "acid", and no longer accepted CO_{2} to be an acid, and "carbonic acid" became the systematic name of H_{2}CO_{3} instead. It was thought that H_{2}CO_{3} could not exist independently, and could only exist in a solution.

In the 1960s, experimenters produced adducts of H_{2}CO_{3}. The diethyl ether adduct H_{2}CO_{3}·O(CH_{2}CH_{3})_{2} was prepared at -78 °C. The dimethyl ether adduct H_{2}CO_{3}·O(CH_{3})_{2} was synthesized at -30 °C using dimethyl ether and sodium carbonate, and confirmed by chemical, thermochemical, IR, and NMR methods. The pure H_{2}CO_{3}·O(CH_{3})_{2} is a solid that decomposes at 5 °C.

In 1987, gaseous H_{2}CO_{3} was prepared by thermolysis of NH_{4}HCO_{3}, and confirmed by IR and collisional activation mass spectrometry. In 1991, solid H_{2}CO_{3} was prepared by solid irradiation of a 1:1 H_{2}O + CO_{2} ice mixture at 20 K (−253.2 °C). The result of this preparation route is termed α−H_{2}CO_{3}. Another synthesis route was to begin by reacting HBr and KHCO_{3} in an aqueous solution, then sublimate away water at 200 K (−73 °C). Confirmed by FTIR spectroscopy. The result of this preparation route is termed β−H_{2}CO_{3}. However, α−H_{2}CO_{3} is later argued to be (CH_{3})O(COOH), a monomethyl ester.

This then leaves the question of why H_{2}CO_{3} has "surprising kinetic stability", and why it took so long for solid-state H_{2}CO_{3} to be isolated. An explanation using transition state theory is that pure H_{2}CO_{3} is in fact rather metastable. At 300 K, its half-life is theoretically predicted to be ~10^{5} years, but in the presence of 2 water molecules, it decreases to ~1 minute. In short, water catalyzes the decomposition of H_{2}CO_{3}.

== Anhydrous carbonic acid ==
According to quantum chemical calculations, at room temperature (300 K), pure carbonic acid is expected to be a kinetically stable gas. There are two main methods to produce anhydrous carbonic acid: reaction of hydrogen chloride and potassium bicarbonate at 100 K in methanol and proton irradiation of pure solid carbon dioxide. Chemically, it behaves as a diprotic Brønsted acid.

Carbonic acid monomers exhibit three conformational isomers: cis–cis, cis–trans, and trans–trans.

At low temperature and atmospheric pressure, solid carbonic acid is amorphous and lacks Bragg peaks in X-ray diffraction. But at high pressure, carbonic acid crystallizes, and modern analytical spectroscopy can measure its geometry, which under certain conditions have space group Cmc2_{1}.

According to neutron diffraction of dideuterated carbonic acid (D_{2}CO_{3}) in a hybrid clamped cell (Ni–Cr–Al Russian alloy/copper-beryllium) at 1.85 GPa, the molecules are planar and form dimers joined by pairs of hydrogen bonds. All three C-O bonds are nearly equidistant at 1.34 Å, intermediate between typical C-O and C=O distances (respectively 1.43 and 1.23 Å). The unusual C-O bond lengths are attributed to delocalized π bonding in the molecule's center and extraordinarily strong hydrogen bonds. The same effects also induce a very short O—O separation (2.13 Å), through the 136° O-H-O angle imposed by the doubly hydrogen-bonded 8-membered rings. The crystal has space group P2_{1}/C. Longer O—O distances are observed in strong intramolecular hydrogen bonds, e.g. in oxalic acid, where the distances exceed 2.4 Å. Trimers and higher polymers are predicted to be even more stable. Based on the stability, it was suggested that solid carbonic acid can be used to sequestrate carbon.

== In aqueous solution ==
In the presence of even a slight amount of water, carbonic acid dehydrates to carbon dioxide and water, which then catalyzes further decomposition.

The hydration equilibrium constant at 25 °C is [H_{2}CO_{3}]/[CO_{2}] ≈ 1.7×10^{−3} in pure water and ≈ 1.2×10^{−3} in seawater. Hence the majority of carbon dioxide at geophysical or biological air-water interfaces does not convert to carbonic acid, remaining dissolved CO_{2} gas. However, the uncatalyzed equilibrium is reached quite slowly: the rate constants are 0.039 s^{−1} for hydration and 23 s^{−1} for dehydration.

=== In biological solutions ===
In the presence of the enzyme carbonic anhydrase, equilibrium is instead reached rapidly, and the following reaction takes precedence:

HCO_{3}^{−} + H^{+} ⇌ CO_{2} + H_{2}O

When the carbon dioxide concentration exceeds its solubility, gas evolves, and a third equilibrium CO_{2}(aq) ⇌ CO_{2}(g) must also be considered. The equilibrium constant for this reaction is defined by Henry's law.

The two reactions can be combined for the equilibrium in solution:
$$\begin{align}
\ce{HCO3^{-}{} + H+{} <=> CO2(aq){} + H2O} && K_3 = \frac{[\ce{H+}][\ce{HCO3^-}]}{[\ce{CO2(aq)}]}
\end{align}$$
When Henry's law is used to calculate the denominator, care is needed with regard to units since Henry's law constant can be commonly expressed with 8 different dimensionalities.

=== In water pH control ===
In wastewater treatment and agricultural irrigation, carbonic acid is used to acidify the water, similar to sulfuric acid and sulfurous acid produced by sulfur burners.

=== Under high CO_{2} partial pressure ===
In the beverage industry, sparkling or "fizzy water" is usually referred to as carbonated water. It is made by dissolving carbon dioxide in water under a small positive pressure. Many soft drinks are treated the same way and effervesce.

Significant amounts of molecular H_{2}CO_{3} exist in aqueous solutions subjected to pressures of multiple gigapascals (tens of thousands of atmospheres) in planetary interiors. Pressures of 0.6–1.6 GPa at 100 K, and 0.75–1.75 GPa at 300 K are attained in the cores of large icy satellites such as Ganymede, Callisto, and Titan, where water and carbon dioxide are present. Pure carbonic acid, being denser than ice, is expected to have sunk beneath the ice layers and separated them from the rocky cores of these moons.

=== From CO_{2} clathrate hydrate ===
Recently, crystalline hydrated carbonic acid was synthesised via a solid-state reaction starting from CO_{2} clathrate hydrate. The CO_{2} clathrate hydrate is compressed at a temperature of 130 K up to pressures higher than 4 GPa. During this compression the clathrate undergoes a progressive amorphisation. At 4 GPa, the sample is isobarically heated up to ambient temperature. Carbonic acid molecules appears during the isobaric heating at 190 K and then organise in a hydrated crystal at 280 K. When the isobaric heating is performed above 5 GPa, the temperatures required for the crystallization of the hydrated carbonic acid are higher and crystals with different stoechiometry and symmetry are obtained.

== Relationship to bicarbonate and carbonate ==
Bjerrum plot of speciation for a hypothetical monoprotic acid: AH concentration as a function of the difference between pK and pH

Carbonic acid is the formal Brønsted–Lowry conjugate acid of the bicarbonate anion, stable in alkaline solution. The protonation constants have been measured to great precision, but depend on overall ionic strength I. The two equilibria most easily measured are as follows:
$$\begin{align}
\ce{CO3^{2-}{} + H+{} <=> HCO3^-} && \beta_1 = \frac{[\ce{HCO3^-}]}{[\ce{H+}][\ce{CO3^{2-}}]} \\
\ce{CO3^{2-}{} + 2H+{} <=> H2CO3} && \beta_2 = \frac{[\ce{H2CO3}]}{[\ce{H+}]^2[\ce{CO3^{2-}}]}
\end{align}$$
where brackets indicate the concentration of species. At 25 °C, these equilibria empirically satisfy
$$\begin{alignat}{6}
\log(\beta_1) =&& 0&.54&I^2 - 0&.96&I +&& 9&.93 \\
\log(\beta_2) =&& -2&.5&I^2 - 0&.043&I +&& 16&.07
\end{alignat}$$
log(β_{1}) decreases with increasing I, as does log(β_{2}). In a solution absent other ions (e.g. I = 0), these curves imply the following stepwise dissociation constants:
$$\begin{alignat}{3}
p\text{K}_1 &= \log(\beta_2) - \log(\beta_1) &= 6.77 \\
p\text{K}_2 &= \log(\beta_1) &= 9.93
\end{alignat}$$
Direct values for these constants in the literature include pK_{1} = 6.35 and pK_{2} - pK_{1} = 3.49.

To interpret these numbers, note that two chemical species in an acid equilibrium are equiconcentrated when pK = pH. In particular, the extracellular fluid (cytosol) in biological systems exhibits pH ≈ 7.2, so that carbonic acid will be almost 50%-dissociated at equilibrium.

=== Ocean acidification ===
Carbonate speciation in seawater (ionic strength 0.7 mol/dm^{3}). The expected change shown is due to the current anthropogenic increase in atmospheric carbon dioxide concentration.

A Bjerrum plot (also known as a Sillén diagram) shows typical equilibrium concentrations of carbon dioxide and its derived species in solution (or seawater) as a function of pH. As human industrialization has increased the proportion of carbon dioxide in Earth's atmosphere, the proportion of carbon dioxide dissolved in sea- and freshwater as carbonic acid is also expected to increase. This rise in dissolved acid is also expected to acidify those waters, generating a decrease in pH. It has been estimated that the increase in dissolved carbon dioxide has already caused the ocean's average surface pH to decrease by about 0.1 from historical pre-industrial levels.
