= Hexahydroxybenzene trisoxalate =

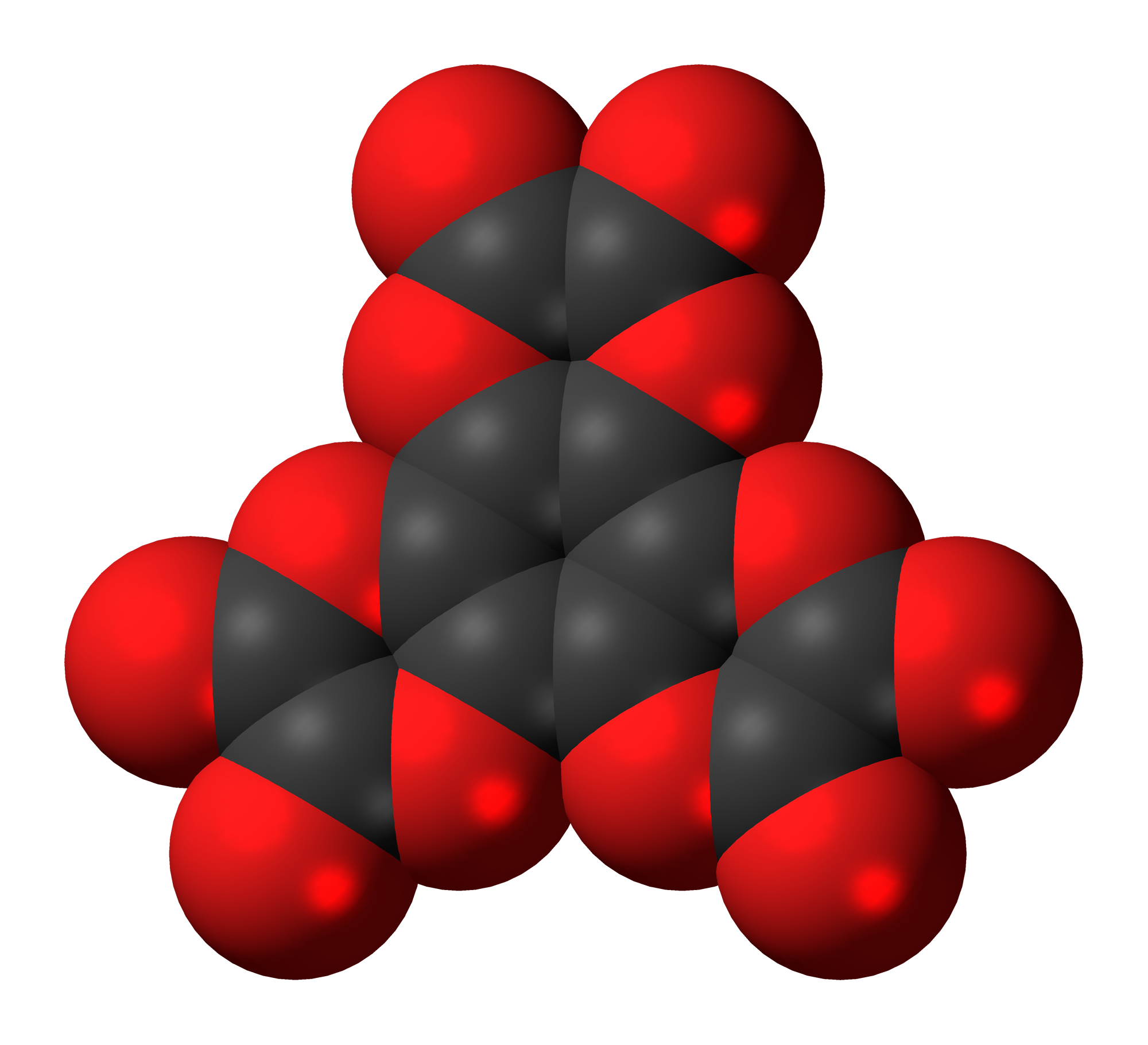

Names
- Preferred IUPAC name Benzo[1,2-b:3,4-b′:5,6-b′′]tris([1,4]dioxine)-2,3,6,7,10,11-hexone
- Other names 1,4,5,8,9,12-Hexaoxatriphenylene-2,3,6,7,10,11-hexone

Identifiers
CAS Number	501891-97-0
3D model (JSmol)	Interactive image
ChemSpider	28426725
PubChem CID	60210024
CompTox Dashboard (EPA)	DTXSID801029312
- InChI: InChI=1S/C12O12/c13-7-8(14)20-2-1(19-7)3-5(22-10(16)9(15)21-3)6-4(2)23-11(17)12(18)24-6 Key: AWPPVEBYMHPZAL-UHFFFAOYSA-N; InChI=1/C12O12/c13-7-8(14)20-2-1(19-7)3-5(22-10(16)9(15)21-3)6-4(2)23-11(17)12(18)24-6 Key: AWPPVEBYMHPZAL-UHFFFAOYAH
- SMILES: O=C1OC2=C3OC(=O)C(=O)OC3=C3OC(=O)C(=O)OC3=C2OC1=O

Properties
Chemical formula	C_{12}O_{12}
Molar mass	336.12 g/mol
- Except where otherwise noted, data are given for materials in their standard state (at 25 °C [77 °F], 100 kPa). verify (what is ?) Infobox references

Hexahydroxybenzene trisoxalate is a chemical compound, an oxide of carbon with formula C_{12}O_{12}. Its molecule consists of a benzene core with the six hydrogen atoms replaced by three oxalate groups. It can be seen as a sixfold ester of benzenehexol and oxalic acid.

The compound was first described by H. S. Verter and R. Dominic in 1967.

== See also ==
- Tetrahydroxy-1,4-benzoquinone bisoxalate
- Tetrahydroxy-1,4-benzoquinone biscarbonate
- Hexahydroxybenzene triscarbonate
