= Tetrahydroxy-1,4-benzoquinone bisoxalate =

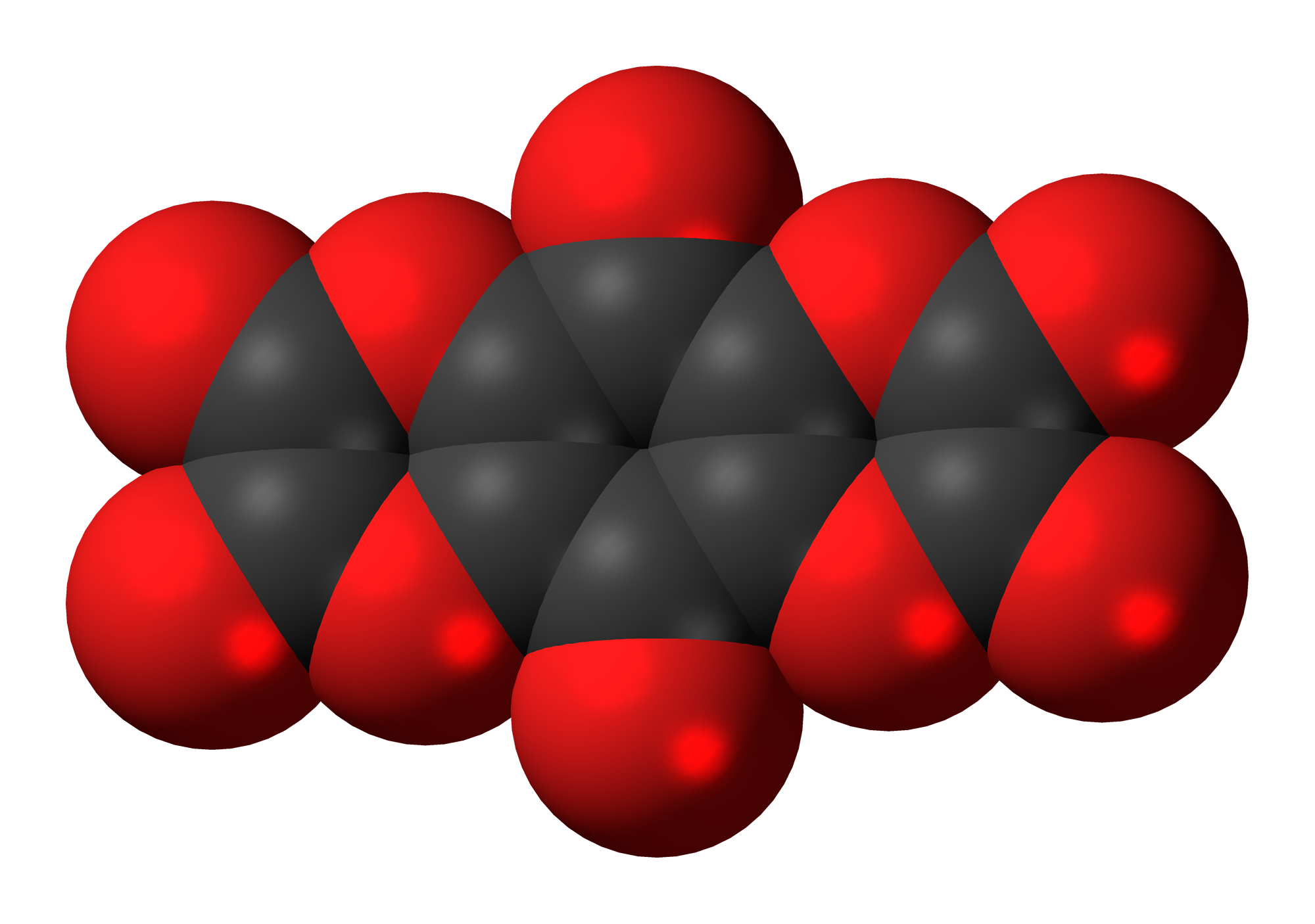

Names
- Preferred IUPAC name Benzo[1,2-b:4,5-b′]bis([1,4]dioxine)hexone
- Other names Benzo[1,2-b:4,5-b']bis-p-dioxin-2,3,5,7,8,10-hexone (8CI)

Identifiers
CAS Number	20068-66-0
3D model (JSmol)	Interactive image
PubChem CID	85762080
UNII	KN8H59SME2
CompTox Dashboard (EPA)	DTXSID801029293
- InChI: InChI=1S/C10O10/c11-1-3-5(19-9(15)7(13)17-3)2(12)6-4(1)18-8(14)10(16)20-6 Key: MRCXLGTUCARGTL-UHFFFAOYSA-N
- SMILES: O=C1C(OC2=O)=C(OC2=O)C(C3=C1OC(C(O3)=O)=O)=O

Properties
Chemical formula	C_{10}O_{10}
Molar mass	280.00 g/mol
- Except where otherwise noted, data are given for materials in their standard state (at 25 °C [77 °F], 100 kPa). verify (what is ?) Infobox references

Tetrahydroxy-1,4-benzoquinone bisoxalate is a chemical compound, an oxide of carbon with formula C_{10}O_{10}. Its molecule consists of a 1,4-benzoquinone core with the four hydrogen atoms replaced by two oxalate groups. It can be seen as a fourfold ester of tetrahydroxy-1,4-benzoquinone and oxalic acid.

The compound was first described by H. S. Verter, H. Porter, and R. Dominic in 1968. It was obtained by reacting tetrahydroxy-1,4-benzoquinone with oxalyl chloride in tetrahydrofuran. It is a yellow solid that can be crystallized as a tetrahydrofuran solvate, but could not be prepared in pure form.

== See also ==
- Tetrahydroxy-1,4-benzoquinone biscarbonate
- Hexahydroxybenzene trisoxalate
- Hexahydroxybenzene triscarbonate
