= Beryllium copper =

Hard, high-strength copper alloy

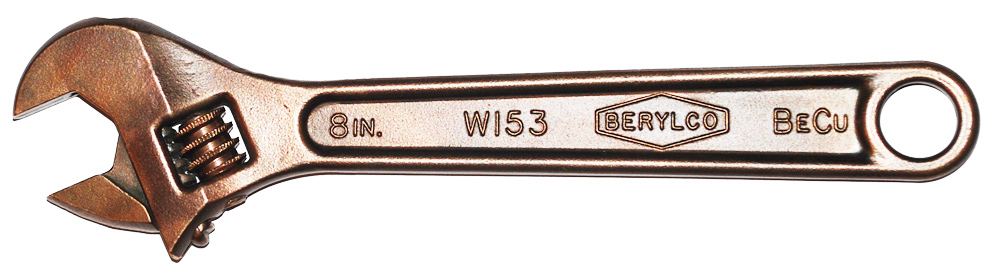
Adjustable Wrench with "BeCu" on the side, to show that it is made from beryllium copper

Beryllium copper (BeCu), also known as copper beryllium (CuBe), beryllium bronze, and spring copper, is a copper alloy with 0.5–3% beryllium. Copper beryllium alloys are often used because of their high strength and good conductivity of both heat and electricity. It is used for its ductility, weldability in metalworking, and machining properties. It has many specialized applications in tools for hazardous environments, musical instruments, precision measurement devices, bullets, and some uses in the field of aerospace. Because beryllium is a hazardous substance, manufacturing processes involving copper beryllium can create a risk of hazardous exposure.

== Properties ==
Beryllium copper is a ductile, weldable, and machinable alloy. Like pure copper, it is resistant to non-oxidizing acids (such as hydrochloric acid and carbonic acid) and plastic decomposition products, to abrasive wear, and to galling. It can be heat-treated for increased strength, durability, and electrical conductivity.

Beryllium copper attains the greatest strength (up to 1,400 MPa (200,000 psi)) of any copper-based alloy. It has thermal conductivity of 62 Btu/h-ft-°F (107 W/m-K), which is 3–5 times higher than tool steel. It has a solid melting point of 1590 °F (866 °C) and a liquid melting point of 1800 °F (982 °C). It has a high capacity for being hot-formed. C17200 beryllium copper alloy has strength and hardness similar to that of steel; Rockwell hardness properties in its peak (aged) condition are in the range of 200 ksi and RC45.

C17200 has effective corrosion-resistant properties when exposed to harsh conditions such as seawater, and down-hole environments. It will withstand sulphide or chloride stress corrosion cracking and will resist the effects of carbon dioxide and hydrogen embrittlement.

Copper alloys in general have always been considered non-sparking. C17200 has the strength to withstand use in hand and mechanical tools. These non-sparking features are best applied in explosive environments such as in the oil & gas and gunpowder industries.

== Toxicity ==
Inhalation of dust, mist, or fumes containing beryllium can cause chronic beryllium disease, which restricts the exchange of oxygen between the lungs and the bloodstream. The International Agency for Research on Cancer (IARC) lists beryllium as a Group 1 human carcinogen. The National Toxicology Program (NTP) also lists beryllium as a carcinogen. Copper beryllium alloy containing less than 2.5% beryllium (in copper) is not designated as a carcinogen.

== Uses ==
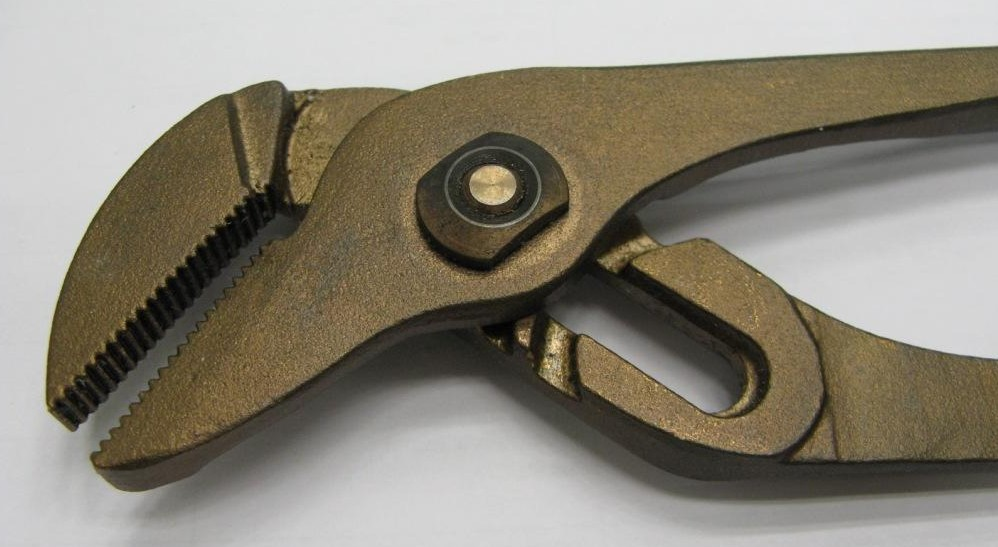
Example of a non-sparking tool made of beryllium copper

Beryllium copper is a non-ferrous alloy used in springs, spring wire, load cells, and other parts that must retain their shape under repeated stress and strain. It has high electrical conductivity and is used in low-current contacts for batteries and electrical connectors.

Beryllium copper is non-sparking yet physically tough and nonmagnetic, fulfilling the requirements of ATEX directive for Zones 0, 1, and 2. Beryllium copper screwdrivers, pliers, wrenches, cold chisels, knives, and hammers are available for environments with explosive hazards, such as oil rigs, coal mines, and grain elevators. An alternative metal sometimes used for non-sparking tools is aluminium bronze. Compared to steel tools, beryllium copper tools are more expensive and not as strong, but the properties of beryllium copper in hazardous environments may outweigh the disadvantages. Some of BeCu's varied uses include:

- Certain percussion instruments, especially tambourines and triangles, because of beryllium copper's consistent tone and resonance.
- Ultra-low temperature cryogenic equipment, such as dilution refrigerators, because of its mechanical strength and relatively high thermal conductivity in this temperature range.
- Molds for manufacturing plastic containers (including most plastic milk jugs), with the blow molding process.
- Armour-piercing bullets, though such an application is unusual, as bullets made from steel alloys are much less expensive and have similar properties.
- Measurement-while-drilling (MWD) tools in the directional drilling industry. A non-magnetic alloy is required, as magnetometers are used for field-strength data received from the tool.
- Servicing magnetic resonance imaging (MRI) and nuclear magnetic resonance (NMR) machines, where high-strength magnetic fields make the use of ferrous tools dangerous, and where magnetic materials in the field can disturb the image.
- Gaskets used to create an RF-tight (resistant to radio frequency leakage) seal, the electronic seal on doors used with EMC testing, and anechoic chambers.
- In the 1980s, beryllium copper was used in the manufacture of golf clubs, particularly wedges and putters. Though some golfers prefer the feel of beryllium copper club heads, regulatory concerns and high costs have made beryllium copper clubs difficult to find in current production.
- Kiefer Plating (defunct) of Elkhart, Indiana built beryllium-copper trumpet bells for the Schilke Music Co. of Chicago. These lightweight bells produce a sound preferred by some musicians.
- Beryllium copper wire is produced in many forms: round, square, flat, and shaped, in coils, on spools, and in straight lengths.
- Beryllium copper valve seats and guides are used in high-performance four-stroke engines with coated titanium valves. BeCu dissipates heat from the valve as much as seven times faster than powdered steel or iron seats and guides. The softer BeCu reduces valve wear and increases valve life.
- For aircraft, beryllium copper’s strength, dimensional stability, and resistance to wear, fatigue, and corrosion suit it for making bearings and bushings for aircraft, and these qualities together with its thermal conductivity make it the best copper alloy for electrical contacts, connectors, and cables.

== Age-hardened alloy ==
Beryllium copper (C17200 & C17300) is an age-hardening alloy that attains the highest strength of any copper base alloy. It may be age hardened after forming into springs, intricate forms, or complex shapes. It is valued for its elasticity, corrosion resistance, stability, conductivity, and low creep.

Tempered beryllium copper is C17200 and C17300, which have been age-hardened and cold-drawn. No further heat treatment is necessary beyond possible light stress relief. It is sufficiently ductile to wind on its diameter and can be formed into springs and most shapes. The tempered wire is most useful where the properties of beryllium copper are desired, but the age-hardening of finished parts is not practical.

C17510 and C17500 beryllium copper alloys are age-hardenable and provide good electrical conductivity, physical properties, and wear-resistance. They are used in springs and wire where electrical conduction or retention of properties at elevated temperatures is important.

== Specialized variants ==
High-strength beryllium copper alloys contain as much as 2.7% beryllium (cast), or 1.6–2% beryllium with about 0.3% cobalt (wrought). The strength is achieved by age hardening. The thermal conductivity of these alloys lies between that of steel and aluminum. The cast alloys are frequently formed with injection molds. The wrought alloys are designated by UNS as C17200 to C17400, the cast alloys are C82000 to C82800. The hardening process requires rapid cooling of the annealed metal, resulting in a solid-state solution of beryllium in copper, which is then kept at 200–460 °C for at least an hour, producing a precipitation of metastable beryllide crystals in the copper matrix. Over-aging beyond the equilibrium phase depletes the beryllide crystals and reduces their strength. The beryllides in cast alloys are similar to those in wrought alloys.

High-conductivity beryllium copper alloys contain as much as 0.7% beryllium with some nickel and cobalt. The thermal conductivity of these alloys is greater than that of aluminum and slightly less than that of pure copper; they are often used as electrical contacts.
