= Fibrifold =

In mathematics, a fibrifold is (roughly) a fiber space whose fibers and base spaces are orbifolds. They were introduced by John Horton Conway, Olaf Delgado Friedrichs, and Daniel H. Huson et al. (2001), who introduced a system of notation for 3-dimensional fibrifolds and used this to assign names to the 219 affine space group types. 184 of these are considered reducible, and 35 irreducible.

== Irreducible cubic space groups ==
The 35/36 irreducible cubic space groups in fibrifold and international index and Hermann–Mauguin notation. 212 and 213 are enantiomorphous pairs giving the same fibrifold notation.

The 35 irreducible space groups correspond to the cubic space group.

35 irreducible space groups
8^{o}:2	4^{−}:2	4^{o}:2	4^{+}:2	2^{−}:2	2^{o}:2	2^{+}:2	1^{o}:2			
8^{o}	4^{−}	4^{o}	4^{+}	2^{−}	2^{o}	2^{+}	1^{o}			
8^{o}/4	4^{−}/4	4^{o}/4	4^{+}/4	2^{−}/4	2^{o}/4	2^{+}/4	1^{o}/4			
8^{−o}	8^{oo}	8^{+o}	4^{− −}	4^{−o}	4^{oo}	4^{+o}	4^{++}	2^{−o}	2^{oo}	2^{+o}

36 cubic groups
Class Point group	Hexoctahedral *432 (m3̅m)	Hextetrahedral *332 (4̅3m)	Gyroidal 432 (432)	Diploidal 3*2 (m3̅)	Tetartoidal 332 (23)
bc lattice (I)	8^{o}:2 (Im3̅m)	4^{o}:2 (I4̅3m)	8^{+o} (I432)	8^{−o} (I3̅)	4^{oo} (I23)
nc lattice (P)	4^{−}:2 (Pm3̅m)	2^{o}:2 (P4̅3m)	4^{−o} (P432)	4^{−} (Pm3̅)	2^{o} (P23)
nc lattice (P)	4^{+}:2 (Pn3̅m)	2^{o}:2 (P4̅3m)	4^{+} (P4_{2}32)	4^{+o} (Pn3̅)	2^{o} (P23)
fc lattice (F)	2^{−}:2 (Fm3̅m)	1^{o}:2 (F4̅3m)	2^{−o} (F432)	2^{−} (Fm3̅)	1^{o} (F23)
fc lattice (F)	2^{+}:2 (Fd3̅m)	1^{o}:2 (F4̅3m)	2^{+} (F4_{1}32)	2^{+o} (Fd3̅)	1^{o} (F23)
Other lattice groups	8^{o} (Pm3̅n); 8^{oo} (Pn3̅n); 4^{− −} (Fm3̅c); 4^{++} (Fd3̅c)	4^{o} (P4̅3n); 2^{oo} (F4̅3c)			
Achiral quarter groups	8^{o}/4 (Ia3̅d)	4^{o}/4 (I4̅3d)	4^{+}/4 (I4_{1}32); 2^{+}/4 (P4_{3}32, P4_{1}32)	2^{−}/4 (Pa3̅); 4^{−}/4 (Ia3̅)	1^{o}/4 (P2_{1}3); 2^{o}/4 (I2_{1}3)

8 primary hexoctahedral hextetrahedral lattices of the cubic space groups	The fibrifold cubic subgroup structure shown is based on extending symmetry of the tetragonal disphenoid fundamental domain of space group 216, similar to the square

Irreducible group symbols (indexed 195−230) in Hermann–Mauguin notation, Fibrifold notation, geometric notation, and Coxeter notation:

Class (Orbifold point group)	Space groups									
Tetartoidal 23 (332)	195	196	197	198	199					
Tetartoidal 23 (332)	P23	F23	I23	P2_{1}3	I2_{1}3					
Tetartoidal 23 (332)	2^{o}	1^{o}	4^{oo}	1^{o}/4	2^{o}/4					
Tetartoidal 23 (332)	P3̅.3̅.2̅	F3̅.3̅.2̅	I3̅.3̅.2̅	P3̅.3̅.2̅_{1}	I3̅.3̅.2̅_{1}					
Tetartoidal 23 (332)	[(4,3^{+},4,2^{+})]	[3^{[4]}]^{+}	[[(4,3^{+},4,2^{+})]]							
Diploidal 4̅3m (3*2)	200	201	202	203	204	205	206			
Diploidal 4̅3m (3*2)	Pm3̅	Pn3̅	Fm3̅	Fd3̅	I3̅	Pa3̅	Ia3̅			
Diploidal 4̅3m (3*2)	4^{−}	4^{+o}	2^{−}	2^{+o}	8^{−o}	2^{−}/4	4^{−}/4			
Diploidal 4̅3m (3*2)	P43̅	P_{n}43̅	F43̅	F_{d}43̅	I43̅	P_{b}43̅	I_{b}43̅			
Diploidal 4̅3m (3*2)	[4,3^{+},4]	[[4,3^{+},4]^{+}]	[4,(3^{1,1})^{+}]	[[3^{[4]}]]^{+}	[[4,3^{+},4]]					
Gyroidal 432 (432)	207	208	209	210	211	212	213	214		
Gyroidal 432 (432)	P432	P4_{2}32	F432	F4_{1}32	I432	P4_{3}32	P4_{1}32	I4_{1}32		
Gyroidal 432 (432)	4^{−o}	4^{+}	2^{−o}	2^{+}	8^{+o}	2^{+}/4		4^{+}/4		
Gyroidal 432 (432)	P4̅.3̅.2̅	P4̅_{2}.3̅.2̅	F4̅.3̅.2̅	F4̅_{1}.3̅.2̅	I4̅.3̅.2̅	P4̅_{3}.3̅.2̅	P4̅_{1}.3̅.2̅	I4̅_{1}.3̅.2̅		
Gyroidal 432 (432)	[4,3,4]^{+}	[[4,3,4]^{+}]^{+}	[4,3^{1,1}]^{+}	[[3^{[4]}]]^{+}	[[4,3,4]]^{+}					
Hextetrahedral 4̅3m (*332)	215	216	217	218	219	220				
Hextetrahedral 4̅3m (*332)	P4̅3m	F4̅3m	I4̅3m	P4̅3n	F4̅3c	I4̅3d				
Hextetrahedral 4̅3m (*332)	2^{o}:2	1^{o}:2	4^{o}:2	4^{o}	2^{oo}	4^{o}/4				
Hextetrahedral 4̅3m (*332)	P33	F33	I33	P_{n}3_{n}3_{n}	F_{c}3_{c}3_{a}	I_{d}3_{d}3_{d}				
Hextetrahedral 4̅3m (*332)	[(4,3,4,2^{+})]	[3^{[4]}]	[[(4,3,4,2^{+})]]	[[(4,3,4,2^{+})]^{+}]	[^{+}(4,{3),4}^{+}]					
Hexoctahedral m3̅m (*432)	221	222	223	224	225	226	227	228	229	230
Hexoctahedral m3̅m (*432)	Pm3̅m	Pn3̅n	Pm3̅n	Pn3̅m	Fm3̅m	Fm3̅c	Fd3̅m	Fd3̅c	Im3̅m	Ia3̅d
Hexoctahedral m3̅m (*432)	4^{−}:2	8^{oo}	8^{o}	4^{+}:2	2^{−}:2	4^{−−}	2^{+}:2	4^{++}	8^{o}:2	8^{o}/4
Hexoctahedral m3̅m (*432)	P43	P_{n}4_{n}3_{n}	P4_{n}3_{n}	P_{n}43	F43	F4_{c}3_{a}	F_{d}4_{n}3	F_{d}4_{c}3_{a}	I43	I_{b}4_{d}3_{d}
Hexoctahedral m3̅m (*432)	[4,3,4]		[[4,3,4]^{+}]	[(4^{+},2^{+})[3^{[4]}]]	[4,3^{1,1}]	[4,(3,4)^{+}]	[[3^{[4]}]]	[[^{+}(4,{3),4}^{+}]]	[[4,3,4]]	
