= List of space groups =

There are 230 space groups in three dimensions, given by a number index, and a full name in Hermann–Mauguin notation, and a short name (international short symbol). The long names are given with spaces for readability. The groups each have a point group of the unit cell.

== Symbols ==
In Hermann–Mauguin notation, space groups are named by a symbol combining the point group identifier with the uppercase letters describing the lattice type. Translations within the lattice in the form of screw axes and glide planes are also noted, giving a complete crystallographic space group.

These are the Bravais lattices in three dimensions:

- P primitive
- I body-centered (from the German Innenzentriert)
- F face-centered (from the German Flächenzentriert)
- S base-centered (from the German Seitenflächenzentriert), or specifically:
  - A centered on A faces only
  - B centered on B faces only
  - C centered on C faces only
- R rhombohedral

A reflection plane m within the point groups can be replaced by a glide plane, labeled as a, b, or c depending on which axis the glide is along. There is also the n glide, which is a glide along the half of a diagonal of a face, and the d glide, which is along a quarter of either a face or space diagonal of the unit cell. The d glide is often called the diamond glide plane as it features in the diamond structure.

- $a$, $b$, or $c$: glide translation along half the lattice vector of this face
- $n$: glide translation along half the diagonal of this face
- $d$: glide planes with translation along a quarter of a face diagonal (the space diagonal in FCC)
- $e$: two glides with the same glide plane and translation along two (different) half-lattice vectors. (Note: The symbol $e$ was introduced by the IUCR in 1992. Prior to this, the space groups Aem2 (No. 39), Aea2 (No. 41), Cmce (No. 64), Cmme (No. 67), and Ccce (No. 68) were known as Abm2 (No. 39), Aba2 (No. 41), Cmca (No. 64), Cmma (No. 67), and Ccca (No. 68) respectively. Historical literature may refer to the old names, but their meaning is unchanged.)

A gyration point can be replaced by a screw axis denoted by a number, n, where the angle of rotation is $\color{Black}\tfrac{360^\circ}{n}$. The degree of translation is then added as a subscript showing how far along the axis the translation is, as a portion of the parallel lattice vector. For example, 2_{1} is a 180° (twofold) rotation followed by a translation of 1/2 of the lattice vector. 3_{1} is a 120° (threefold) rotation followed by a translation of 1/3 of the lattice vector. The possible screw axes are: 2_{1}, 3_{1}, 3_{2}, 4_{1}, 4_{2}, 4_{3}, 6_{1}, 6_{2}, 6_{3}, 6_{4}, and 6_{5}.

Wherever there is both a rotation or screw axis n and a mirror or glide plane m along the same crystallographic direction, they are represented as a fraction $\frac{n}{m}$ or n/m. For example, 4_{1}/a means that the crystallographic axis in question contains both a 4_{1} screw axis as well as a glide plane along a.

In Schoenflies notation, the symbol of a space group is represented by the symbol of corresponding point group with additional superscript. The superscript doesn't give any additional information about symmetry elements of the space group, but is instead related to the order in which Schoenflies derived the space groups. This is sometimes supplemented with a symbol of the form $\Gamma_x^y$ which specifies the Bravais lattice. Here $x \in \{t, m, o, q, rh, h, c\}$ is the lattice system, and $y \in \{\empty, b, v, f\}$ is the centering type.

In Fedorov symbol, the type of space group is denoted as s (symmorphic ), h (hemisymmorphic), or a (asymmorphic). The number is related to the order in which Fedorov derived space groups. There are 73 symmorphic, 54 hemisymmorphic, and 103 asymmorphic space groups.

=== Symmorphic ===
The 73 symmorphic space groups can be obtained as combination of Bravais lattices with corresponding point group. These groups contain the same symmetry elements as the corresponding point groups. Example for point group 4/mmm ($\tfrac{4}{m}\tfrac{2}{m}\tfrac{2}{m}$): the symmorphic space groups are P4/mmm ($P\tfrac{4}{m}\tfrac{2}{m}\tfrac{2}{m}$, 36s) and I4/mmm ($I\tfrac{4}{m}\tfrac{2}{m}\tfrac{2}{m}$, 37s).

=== Hemisymmorphic ===
The 54 hemisymmorphic space groups contain only axial combination of symmetry elements from the corresponding point groups. Example for point group 4/mmm ($\tfrac{4}{m}\tfrac{2}{m}\tfrac{2}{m}$): hemisymmorphic space groups contain the axial combination 422, but at least one mirror plane m will be substituted with glide plane, for example P4/mcc ($P\tfrac{4}{m}\tfrac{2}{c}\tfrac{2}{c}$, 35h), P4/nbm ($P\tfrac{4}{n}\tfrac{2}{b}\tfrac{2}{m}$, 36h), P4/nnc ($P\tfrac{4}{n}\tfrac{2}{n}\tfrac{2}{c}$, 37h), and I4/mcm ($I\tfrac{4}{m}\tfrac{2}{c}\tfrac{2}{m}$, 38h).

=== Asymmorphic ===
The remaining 103 space groups are asymmorphic. Example for point group 4/mmm ($\tfrac{4}{m}\tfrac{2}{m}\tfrac{2}{m}$): P4/mbm ($P\tfrac{4}{m}\tfrac{2_1}{b}\tfrac{2}{m}$, 54a), P4_{2}/mmc ($P\tfrac{4_2}{m}\tfrac{2}{m}\tfrac{2}{c}$, 60a), I4_{1}/acd ($I\tfrac{4_1}{a}\tfrac{2}{c}\tfrac{2}{d}$, 58a) - none of these groups contains the axial combination 422.

== List of triclinic ==
Triclinic Bravais lattice

Triclinic crystal system
Number	Point group	Orbifold	Short name	Full name	Schoenflies	Fedorov	Shubnikov	Fibrifold
1	1	$1$	P1	P 1	$\Gamma_tC_1^1$	1s	$(a/b/c)\cdot 1$	$(\circ)$
2	1̅	$\times$	P1̅	P 1̅	$\Gamma_tC_i^1$	2s	$(a/b/c)\cdot \tilde 2$	$(2222)$

== List of monoclinic ==
Monoclinic Bravais lattice
Simple (P)	Base (S)

Monoclinic crystal system
Number	Point group	Orbifold	Short name	Full name(s)		Schoenflies	Fedorov	Shubnikov	Fibrifold (primary)	Fibrifold (secondary)
3	2	$22$	P2	P 1 2 1	P 1 1 2	$\Gamma_mC_2^1$	3s	$(b:(c/a)):2$	$(2_02_02_02_0)$	$({*}_0{*}_0)$
4	2	$22$	P2_{1}	P 1 2_{1} 1	P 1 1 2_{1}	$\Gamma_mC_2^2$	1a	$(b:(c/a)):2_1$	$(2_12_12_12_1)$	$(\bar{\times}\bar{\times})$
5	2	$22$	C2	C 1 2 1	B 1 1 2	$\Gamma_m^bC_2^3$	4s	$\left ( \tfrac{a+b}{2}/b:(c/a)\right ) :2$	$(2_02_02_12_1)$	$({*}_1{*}_1)$, $({*}\bar{\times})$
6	m	$*$	Pm	P 1 m 1	P 1 1 m	$\Gamma_mC_s^1$	5s	$(b:(c/a))\cdot m$	$[\circ_0]$	$({*}{\cdot}{*}{\cdot})$
7	m	$*$	Pc	P 1 c 1	P 1 1 b	$\Gamma_mC_s^2$	1h	$(b:(c/a))\cdot \tilde c$	$(\bar\circ_0)$	$({*}{:}{*}{:})$, $({\times}{\times}_0)$
8	m	$*$	Cm	C 1 m 1	B 1 1 m	$\Gamma_m^bC_s^3$	6s	$\left ( \tfrac{a+b}{2}/b:(c/a)\right ) \cdot m$	$[\circ_1]$	$({*}{\cdot}{*}{:})$, $({*}{\cdot}{\times})$
9	m	$*$	Cc	C 1 c 1	B 1 1 b	$\Gamma_m^bC_s^4$	2h	$\left ( \tfrac{a+b}{2}/b:(c/a)\right ) \cdot \tilde c$	$(\bar\circ_1)$	$({*}{:}{\times})$, $({\times}{\times}_1)$
10	2/m	$2*$	P2/m	P 1 2/m 1	P 1 1 2/m	$\Gamma_mC_{2h}^1$	7s	$(b:(c/a))\cdot m:2$	$[2_02_02_02_0]$	$(*2{\cdot}22{\cdot}2)$
11	2/m	$2*$	P2_{1}/m	P 1 2_{1}/m 1	P 1 1 2_{1}/m	$\Gamma_mC_{2h}^2$	2a	$(b:(c/a))\cdot m:2_1$	$[2_12_12_12_1]$	$(22{*}{\cdot})$
12	2/m	$2*$	C2/m	C 1 2/m 1	B 1 1 2/m	$\Gamma_m^bC_{2h}^3$	8s	$\left ( \tfrac{a+b}{2}/b:(c/a)\right ) \cdot m:2$	$[2_02_02_12_1]$	$(*2{\cdot}22{:}2)$, $(2\bar{*}2{\cdot}2)$
13	2/m	$2*$	P2/c	P 1 2/c 1	P 1 1 2/b	$\Gamma_mC_{2h}^4$	3h	$(b:(c/a))\cdot \tilde c:2$	$(2_02_022)$	$(*2{:}22{:}2)$, $(22{*}_0)$
14	2/m	$2*$	P2_{1}/c	P 1 2_{1}/c 1	P 1 1 2_{1}/b	$\Gamma_mC_{2h}^5$	3a	$(b:(c/a))\cdot \tilde c:2_1$	$(2_12_122)$	$(22{*}{:})$, $(22{\times})$
15	2/m	$2*$	C2/c	C 1 2/c 1	B 1 1 2/b	$\Gamma_m^bC_{2h}^6$	4h	$\left ( \tfrac{a+b}{2}/b:(c/a)\right ) \cdot \tilde c:2$	$(2_02_122)$	$(2\bar{*}2{:}2)$, $(22{*}_1)$

== List of orthorhombic ==
Orthorhombic Bravais lattice
Simple (P)	Body (I)	Face (F)	Base (S)

Orthorhombic crystal system
Number	Point group	Orbifold	Short name	Full name	Schoenflies	Fedorov	Shubnikov	Fibrifold (primary)	Fibrifold (secondary)
16	222	$222$	P222	P 2 2 2	$\Gamma_oD_2^1$	9s	$(c:a:b):2:2$	$(*2_02_02_02_0)$	
17	222	$222$	P222_{1}	P 2 2 2_{1}	$\Gamma_oD_2^2$	4a	$(c:a:b):2_1:2$	$(*2_12_12_12_1)$	$(2_02_0{*})$
18	222	$222$	P2_{1}2_{1}2	P 2_{1} 2_{1} 2	$\Gamma_oD_2^3$	7a	$(c:a:b):2$ $2_1$	$(2_02_0\bar{\times})$	$(2_12_1{*})$
19	222	$222$	P2_{1}2_{1}2_{1}	P 2_{1} 2_{1} 2_{1}	$\Gamma_oD_2^4$	8a	$(c:a:b):2_1$ $2_1$	$(2_12_1\bar{\times})$	
20	222	$222$	C222_{1}	C 2 2 2_{1}	$\Gamma_o^bD_2^5$	5a	$\left ( \tfrac{a+b}{2}:c:a:b\right ) :2_1:2$	$(2_1{*}2_12_1)$	$(2_02_1{*})$
21	222	$222$	C222	C 2 2 2	$\Gamma_o^bD_2^6$	10s	$\left ( \tfrac{a+b}{2}:c:a:b\right ) :2:2$	$(2_0{*}2_02_0)$	$(*2_02_02_12_1)$
22	222	$222$	F222	F 2 2 2	$\Gamma_o^fD_2^7$	12s	$\left ( \tfrac{a+c}{2}/\tfrac{b+c}{2}/\tfrac{a+b}{2}:c:a:b\right ) :2:2$	$(*2_02_12_02_1)$	
23	222	$222$	I222	I 2 2 2	$\Gamma_o^vD_2^8$	11s	$\left ( \tfrac{a+b+c}{2}/c:a:b\right ) :2:2$	$(2_1{*}2_02_0)$	
24	222	$222$	I2_{1}2_{1}2_{1}	I 2_{1} 2_{1} 2_{1}	$\Gamma_o^vD_2^9$	6a	$\left ( \tfrac{a+b+c}{2}/c:a:b \right ) :2:2_1$	$(2_0{*}2_12_1)$	
25	mm2	$*22$	Pmm2	P m m 2	$\Gamma_oC_{2v}^1$	13s	$(c:a:b):m \cdot 2$	$(*{\cdot}2{\cdot}2{\cdot}2{\cdot}2)$	$[{*}_0{\cdot}{*}_0{\cdot}]$
26	mm2	$*22$	Pmc2_{1}	P m c 2_{1}	$\Gamma_oC_{2v}^2$	9a	$(c:a:b): \tilde c \cdot 2_1$	$(*{\cdot}2{:}2{\cdot}2{:}2)$	$(\bar{*}{\cdot}\bar{*}{\cdot})$, $[{\times_0}{\times_0}]$
27	mm2	$*22$	Pcc2	P c c 2	$\Gamma_oC_{2v}^3$	5h	$(c:a:b): \tilde c \cdot 2$	$(*{:}2{:}2{:}2{:}2)$	$(\bar{*}_0\bar{*}_0)$
28	mm2	$*22$	Pma2	P m a 2	$\Gamma_oC_{2v}^4$	6h	$(c:a:b): \tilde a \cdot 2$	$(2_02_0{*}{\cdot})$	$[{*}_0{:}{*}_0{:}]$, $(*{\cdot}{*}_0)$
29	mm2	$*22$	Pca2_{1}	P c a 2_{1}	$\Gamma_oC_{2v}^5$	11a	$(c:a:b): \tilde a \cdot 2_1$	$(2_12_1{*}{:})$	$(\bar{*}{:}\bar{*}{:})$
30	mm2	$*22$	Pnc2	P n c 2	$\Gamma_oC_{2v}^6$	7h	$(c:a:b): \tilde c \odot 2$	$(2_02_0{*}{:})$	$(\bar{*}_1\bar{*}_1)$, $({*}_0{\times}_0)$
31	mm2	$*22$	Pmn2_{1}	P m n 2_{1}	$\Gamma_oC_{2v}^7$	10a	$(c:a:b): \widetilde{ac} \cdot 2_1$	$(2_12_1{*}{\cdot})$	$(*{\cdot}\bar{\times})$, $[{\times}_0{\times}_1]$
32	mm2	$*22$	Pba2	P b a 2	$\Gamma_oC_{2v}^8$	9h	$(c:a:b): \tilde a \odot 2$	$(2_02_0{\times}_0)$	$(*{:}{*}_0)$
33	mm2	$*22$	Pna2_{1}	P n a 2_{1}	$\Gamma_oC_{2v}^9$	12a	$(c:a:b): \tilde a \odot 2_1$	$(2_12_1{\times})$	$(*{:}{\times})$, $({\times}{\times}_1)$
34	mm2	$*22$	Pnn2	P n n 2	$\Gamma_oC_{2v}^{10}$	8h	$(c:a:b): \widetilde{ac} \odot 2$	$(2_02_0{\times}_1)$	$(*_0{\times}_1)$
35	mm2	$*22$	Cmm2	C m m 2	$\Gamma_o^bC_{2v}^{11}$	14s	$\left ( \tfrac{a+b}{2}:c:a:b\right ) :m \cdot 2$	$(2_0{*}{\cdot}2{\cdot}2)$	$[*_0{\cdot}{*}_0{:}]$
36	mm2	$*22$	Cmc2_{1}	C m c 2_{1}	$\Gamma_o^bC_{2v}^{12}$	13a	$\left ( \tfrac{a+b}{2}:c:a:b\right ) :\tilde c \cdot 2_1$	$(2_1{*}{\cdot}2{:}2)$	$(\bar{*}{\cdot}\bar{*}{:})$, $[{\times}_1{\times}_1]$
37	mm2	$*22$	Ccc2	C c c 2	$\Gamma_o^bC_{2v}^{13}$	10h	$\left ( \tfrac{a+b}{2}:c:a:b\right ) : \tilde c \cdot 2$	$(2_0{*}{:}2{:}2)$	$(\bar{*}_0\bar{*}_1)$
38	mm2	$*22$	Amm2	A m m 2	$\Gamma_o^bC_{2v}^{14}$	15s	$\left ( \tfrac{b+c}{2}/c:a:b\right ):m \cdot 2$	$(*{\cdot}2{\cdot}2{\cdot}2{:}2)$	$[{*}_1{\cdot}{*}_1{\cdot}]$, $[*{\cdot}{\times}_0]$
39	mm2	$*22$	Aem2	A b m 2	$\Gamma_o^bC_{2v}^{15}$	11h	$\left ( \tfrac{b+c}{2}/c:a:b\right ) :m \cdot 2_1$	$(*{\cdot}2{:}2{:}2{:}2)$	$[{*}_1{:}{*}_1{:}]$, $(\bar{*}{\cdot}\bar{*}_0)$
40	mm2	$*22$	Ama2	A m a 2	$\Gamma_o^bC_{2v}^{16}$	12h	$\left ( \tfrac{b+c}{2}/c:a:b\right ) : \tilde a \cdot 2$	$(2_02_1{*}{\cdot})$	$(*{\cdot}{*}_1)$, $[*{:}{\times}_1]$
41	mm2	$*22$	Aea2	A b a 2	$\Gamma_o^bC_{2v}^{17}$	13h	$\left ( \tfrac{b+c}{2}/c:a:b\right ) : \tilde a \cdot 2_1$	$(2_02_1{*}{:})$	$(*{:}{*}_1)$, $(\bar{*}{:}\bar{*}_1)$
42	mm2	$*22$	Fmm2	F m m 2	$\Gamma_o^fC_{2v}^{18}$	17s	$\left ( \tfrac{a+c}{2}/\tfrac{b+c}{2}/\tfrac{a+b}{2}:c:a:b\right ) :m \cdot 2$	$(*{\cdot}2{\cdot}2{:}2{:}2)$	$[{*}_1{\cdot}{*}_1{:}]$
43	mm2	$*22$	Fdd2	F d d 2	$\Gamma_o^fC_{2v}^{19}$	16h	$\left ( \tfrac{a+c}{2}/\tfrac{b+c}{2}/\tfrac{a+b}{2}:c:a:b \right ) : \tfrac{1}{2} \widetilde{ac} \odot 2$	$(2_02_1{\times})$	$({*}_1{\times})$
44	mm2	$*22$	Imm2	I m m 2	$\Gamma_o^vC_{2v}^{20}$	16s	$\left ( \tfrac{a+b+c}{2}/c:a:b \right ) :m \cdot 2$	$(2_1{*}{\cdot}2{\cdot}2)$	$[*{\cdot}{\times}_1]$
45	mm2	$*22$	Iba2	I b a 2	$\Gamma_o^vC_{2v}^{21}$	15h	$\left ( \tfrac{a+b+c}{2}/c:a:b \right ) : \tilde c \cdot 2$	$(2_1{*}{:}2{:}2)$	$(\bar{*}{:}\bar{*}_0)$
46	mm2	$*22$	Ima2	I m a 2	$\Gamma_o^vC_{2v}^{22}$	14h	$\left ( \tfrac{a+b+c}{2}/c:a:b \right ) : \tilde a \cdot 2$	$(2_0{*}{\cdot}2{:}2)$	$(\bar{*}{\cdot}\bar{*}_1)$, $[*{:}{\times}_0]$
47	2/m 2/m 2/m (mmm)	$*222$	Pmmm	P 2/m 2/m 2/m	$\Gamma_oD_{2h}^1$	18s	$\left ( c:a:b \right ) \cdot m:2 \cdot m$	$[*{\cdot}2{\cdot}2{\cdot}2{\cdot}2]$	
48	2/m 2/m 2/m (mmm)	$*222$	Pnnn	P 2/n 2/n 2/n	$\Gamma_oD_{2h}^2$	19h	$\left ( c:a:b \right ) \cdot \widetilde{ab}:2 \odot \widetilde{ac}$	$(2\bar{*}_12_02_0)$	
49	2/m 2/m 2/m (mmm)	$*222$	Pccm	P 2/c 2/c 2/m	$\Gamma_oD_{2h}^3$	17h	$\left ( c:a:b \right ) \cdot m:2 \cdot \tilde c$	$[*{:}2{:}2{:}2{:}2]$	$(*2_02_02{\cdot}2)$
50	2/m 2/m 2/m (mmm)	$*222$	Pban	P 2/b 2/a 2/n	$\Gamma_oD_{2h}^4$	18h	$\left ( c:a:b \right ) \cdot \widetilde{ab}:2 \odot \tilde a$	$(2\bar{*}_02_02_0)$	$(*2_02_02{:}2)$
51	2/m 2/m 2/m (mmm)	$*222$	Pmma	P 2_{1}/m 2/m 2/a	$\Gamma_oD_{2h}^5$	14a	$\left ( c:a:b \right ) \cdot \tilde a :2 \cdot m$	$[2_02_0{*}{\cdot}]$	$[*{\cdot}2{:}2{\cdot}2{:}2]$, $[*2{\cdot}2{\cdot}2{\cdot}2]$
52	2/m 2/m 2/m (mmm)	$*222$	Pnna	P 2/n 2_{1}/n 2/a	$\Gamma_oD_{2h}^6$	17a	$\left ( c:a:b \right ) \cdot \tilde a:2 \odot \widetilde{ac}$	$(2_02\bar{*}_1)$	$(2_0{*}2{:}2)$, $(2\bar{*}2_12_1)$
53	2/m 2/m 2/m (mmm)	$*222$	Pmna	P 2/m 2/n 2_{1}/a	$\Gamma_oD_{2h}^7$	15a	$\left ( c:a:b \right ) \cdot \tilde a:2_1 \cdot \widetilde{ac}$	$[2_02_0{*}{:}]$	$(*2_12_12{\cdot}2)$, $(2_0{*}2{\cdot}2)$
54	2/m 2/m 2/m (mmm)	$*222$	Pcca	P 2_{1}/c 2/c 2/a	$\Gamma_oD_{2h}^8$	16a	$\left ( c:a:b \right ) \cdot \tilde a:2 \cdot \tilde c$	$(2_02\bar{*}_0)$	$(*2{:}2{:}2{:}2)$, $(*2_12_12{:}2)$
55	2/m 2/m 2/m (mmm)	$*222$	Pbam	P 2_{1}/b 2_{1}/a 2/m	$\Gamma_oD_{2h}^9$	22a	$\left ( c:a:b \right ) \cdot m:2 \odot \tilde a$	$[2_02_0{\times}_0]$	$(*2{\cdot}2{:}2{\cdot}2)$
56	2/m 2/m 2/m (mmm)	$*222$	Pccn	P 2_{1}/c 2_{1}/c 2/n	$\Gamma_oD_{2h}^{10}$	27a	$\left ( c:a:b \right ) \cdot \widetilde{ab}:2 \cdot \tilde c$	$(2\bar{*}{:}2{:}2)$	$(2_12\bar{*}_0)$
57	2/m 2/m 2/m (mmm)	$*222$	Pbcm	P 2/b 2_{1}/c 2_{1}/m	$\Gamma_oD_{2h}^{11}$	23a	$\left ( c:a:b \right ) \cdot m:2_1 \odot \tilde c$	$(2_02\bar{*}{\cdot})$	$(*2{:}2{\cdot}2{:}2)$, $[2_12_1{*}{:}]$
58	2/m 2/m 2/m (mmm)	$*222$	Pnnm	P 2_{1}/n 2_{1}/n 2/m	$\Gamma_oD_{2h}^{12}$	25a	$\left ( c:a:b \right ) \cdot m:2 \odot \widetilde{ac}$	$[2_02_0{\times}_1]$	$(2_1{*}2{\cdot}2)$
59	2/m 2/m 2/m (mmm)	$*222$	Pmmn	P 2_{1}/m 2_{1}/m 2/n	$\Gamma_oD_{2h}^{13}$	24a	$\left ( c:a:b \right ) \cdot \widetilde{ab}:2 \cdot m$	$(2\bar{*}{\cdot}2{\cdot}2)$	$[2_12_1{*}{\cdot}]$
60	2/m 2/m 2/m (mmm)	$*222$	Pbcn	P 2_{1}/b 2/c 2_{1}/n	$\Gamma_oD_{2h}^{14}$	26a	$\left ( c:a:b \right ) \cdot \widetilde{ab}:2_1 \odot \tilde c$	$(2_02\bar{*}{:})$	$(2_1{*}2{:}2)$, $(2_12\bar{*}_1)$
61	2/m 2/m 2/m (mmm)	$*222$	Pbca	P 2_{1}/b 2_{1}/c 2_{1}/a	$\Gamma_oD_{2h}^{15}$	29a	$\left ( c:a:b \right ) \cdot \tilde a:2_1 \odot \tilde c$	$(2_12\bar{*}{:})$	
62	2/m 2/m 2/m (mmm)	$*222$	Pnma	P 2_{1}/n 2_{1}/m 2_{1}/a	$\Gamma_oD_{2h}^{16}$	28a	$\left ( c:a:b \right ) \cdot \tilde a:2_1 \odot m$	$(2_12\bar{*}{\cdot})$	$(2\bar{*}{\cdot}2{:}2)$, $[2_12_1{\times}]$
63	2/m 2/m 2/m (mmm)	$*222$	Cmcm	C 2/m 2/c 2_{1}/m	$\Gamma_o^bD_{2h}^{17}$	18a	$\left ( \tfrac{a+b}{2}:c:a:b\right ) \cdot m:2_1 \cdot \tilde c$	$[2_02_1{*}{\cdot}]$	$(*2{\cdot}2{\cdot}2{:}2)$, $[2_1{*}{\cdot}2{:}2]$
64	2/m 2/m 2/m (mmm)	$*222$	Cmce	C 2/m 2/c 2_{1}/a	$\Gamma_o^bD_{2h}^{18}$	19a	$\left ( \tfrac{a+b}{2}:c:a:b\right ) \cdot \tilde a :2_1 \cdot \tilde c$	$[2_02_1{*}{:}]$	$(*2{\cdot}2{:}2{:}2)$, $(*2_12{\cdot}2{:}2)$
65	2/m 2/m 2/m (mmm)	$*222$	Cmmm	C 2/m 2/m 2/m	$\Gamma_o^bD_{2h}^{19}$	19s	$\left ( \tfrac{a+b}{2}:c:a:b\right ) \cdot m:2 \cdot m$	$[2_0{*}{\cdot}2{\cdot}2]$	$[*{\cdot}2{\cdot}2{\cdot}2{:}2]$
66	2/m 2/m 2/m (mmm)	$*222$	Cccm	C 2/c 2/c 2/m	$\Gamma_o^bD_{2h}^{20}$	20h	$\left ( \tfrac{a+b}{2}:c:a:b\right ) \cdot m:2 \cdot \tilde c$	$[2_0{*}{:}2{:}2]$	$(*2_02_12{\cdot}2)$
67	2/m 2/m 2/m (mmm)	$*222$	Cmme	C 2/m 2/m 2/e	$\Gamma_o^bD_{2h}^{21}$	21h	$\left ( \tfrac{a+b}{2}:c:a:b\right ) \cdot \tilde a :2 \cdot m$	$(*2_02{\cdot}2{\cdot}2)$	$[*{\cdot}2{:}2{:}2{:}2]$
68	2/m 2/m 2/m (mmm)	$*222$	Ccce	C 2/c 2/c 2/e	$\Gamma_o^bD_{2h}^{22}$	22h	$\left ( \tfrac{a+b}{2}:c:a:b\right ) \cdot \tilde a :2 \cdot \tilde c$	$(*2_02{:}2{:}2)$	$(*2_02_12{:}2)$
69	2/m 2/m 2/m (mmm)	$*222$	Fmmm	F 2/m 2/m 2/m	$\Gamma_o^fD_{2h}^{23}$	21s	$\left ( \tfrac{a+c}{2}/\tfrac{b+c}{2}/\tfrac{a+b}{2}:c:a:b\right ) \cdot m:2 \cdot m$	$[*{\cdot}2{\cdot}2{:}2{:}2]$	
70	2/m 2/m 2/m (mmm)	$*222$	Fddd	F 2/d 2/d 2/d	$\Gamma_o^fD_{2h}^{24}$	24h	$\left ( \tfrac{a+c}{2}/\tfrac{b+c}{2}/\tfrac{a+b}{2}:c:a:b\right ) \cdot \tfrac{1}{2}\widetilde{ab}:2 \odot \tfrac{1}{2}\widetilde{ac}$	$(2\bar{*}2_02_1)$	
71	2/m 2/m 2/m (mmm)	$*222$	Immm	I 2/m 2/m 2/m	$\Gamma_o^vD_{2h}^{25}$	20s	$\left ( \tfrac{a+b+c}{2}/c:a:b\right ) \cdot m:2 \cdot m$	$[2_1{*}{\cdot}2{\cdot}2]$	
72	2/m 2/m 2/m (mmm)	$*222$	Ibam	I 2/b 2/a 2/m	$\Gamma_o^vD_{2h}^{26}$	23h	$\left ( \tfrac{a+b+c}{2}/c:a:b\right ) \cdot m:2 \cdot \tilde c$	$[2_1{*}{:}2{:}2]$	$(*2_02{\cdot}2{:}2)$
73	2/m 2/m 2/m (mmm)	$*222$	Ibca	I 2/b 2/c 2/a	$\Gamma_o^vD_{2h}^{27}$	21a	$\left ( \tfrac{a+b+c}{2}/c:a:b\right ) \cdot \tilde a :2 \cdot \tilde c$	$(*2_12{:}2{:}2)$	
74	2/m 2/m 2/m (mmm)	$*222$	Imma	I 2/m 2/m 2/a	$\Gamma_o^vD_{2h}^{28}$	20a	$\left ( \tfrac{a+b+c}{2}/c:a:b\right ) \cdot \tilde a :2 \cdot m$	$(*2_12{\cdot}2{\cdot}2)$	$[2_0{*}{\cdot}2{:}2]$

== List of tetragonal ==
Tetragonal Bravais lattice
Simple (P)	Body (I)

Tetragonal crystal system
Number	Point group	Orbifold	Short name	Full name	Schoenflies	Fedorov	Shubnikov	Fibrifold
75	4	$44$	P4	P 4	$\Gamma_qC_4^1$	22s	$(c:a:a):4$	$(4_04_02_0)$
76	4	$44$	P4_{1}	P 4_{1}	$\Gamma_qC_4^2$	30a	$(c:a:a) :4_1$	$(4_14_12_1)$
77	4	$44$	P4_{2}	P 4_{2}	$\Gamma_qC_4^3$	33a	$(c:a:a) :4_2$	$(4_24_22_0)$
78	4	$44$	P4_{3}	P 4_{3}	$\Gamma_qC_4^4$	31a	$(c:a:a) :4_3$	$(4_14_12_1)$
79	4	$44$	I4	I 4	$\Gamma_q^vC_4^5$	23s	$\left ( \tfrac{a+b+c}{2}/c:a:a\right ) :4$	$(4_24_02_1)$
80	4	$44$	I4_{1}	I 4_{1}	$\Gamma_q^vC_4^6$	32a	$\left ( \tfrac{a+b+c}{2}/c:a:a\right ) :4_1$	$(4_34_12_0)$
81	4̅	$2\times$	P4̅	P 4̅	$\Gamma_qS_4^1$	26s	$(c:a:a):\tilde 4$	$(442_0)$
82	4̅	$2\times$	I4̅	I 4̅	$\Gamma_q^vS_4^2$	27s	$\left ( \tfrac{a+b+c}{2}/c:a:a\right ) :\tilde 4$	$(442_1)$
83	4/m	$4*$	P4/m	P 4/m	$\Gamma_qC_{4h}^1$	28s	$(c:a:a)\cdot m:4$	$[4_04_02_0]$
84	4/m	$4*$	P4_{2}/m	P 4_{2}/m	$\Gamma_qC_{4h}^2$	41a	$(c:a:a)\cdot m:4_2$	$[4_24_22_0]$
85	4/m	$4*$	P4/n	P 4/n	$\Gamma_qC_{4h}^3$	29h	$(c:a:a)\cdot \widetilde{ab}:4$	$(44_02)$
86	4/m	$4*$	P4_{2}/n	P 4_{2}/n	$\Gamma_qC_{4h}^4$	42a	$(c:a:a)\cdot \widetilde{ab}:4_2$	$(44_22)$
87	4/m	$4*$	I4/m	I 4/m	$\Gamma_q^vC_{4h}^5$	29s	$\left ( \tfrac{a+b+c}{2}/c:a:a\right ) \cdot m:4$	$[4_24_02_1]$
88	4/m	$4*$	I4_{1}/a	I 4_{1}/a	$\Gamma_q^vC_{4h}^6$	40a	$\left ( \tfrac{a+b+c}{2}/c:a:a\right ) \cdot \tilde a :4_1$	$(44_12)$
89	422	$224$	P422	P 4 2 2	$\Gamma_qD_4^1$	30s	$(c:a:a):4:2$	$(*4_04_02_0)$
90	422	$224$	P42_{1}2	P42_{1}2	$\Gamma_qD_4^2$	43a	$(c:a:a):4$ $2_1$	$(4_0{*}2_0)$
91	422	$224$	P4_{1}22	P 4_{1} 2 2	$\Gamma_qD_4^3$	44a	$(c:a:a):4_1:2$	$(*4_14_12_1)$
92	422	$224$	P4_{1}2_{1}2	P 4_{1} 2_{1} 2	$\Gamma_qD_4^4$	48a	$(c:a:a):4_1$ $2_1$	$(4_1{*}2_1)$
93	422	$224$	P4_{2}22	P 4_{2} 2 2	$\Gamma_qD_4^5$	47a	$(c:a:a):4_2:2$	$(*4_24_22_0)$
94	422	$224$	P4_{2}2_{1}2	P 4_{2} 2_{1} 2	$\Gamma_qD_4^6$	50a	$(c:a:a):4_2$ $2_1$	$(4_2{*}2_0)$
95	422	$224$	P4_{3}22	P 4_{3} 2 2	$\Gamma_qD_4^7$	45a	$(c:a:a):4_3:2$	$(*4_14_12_1)$
96	422	$224$	P4_{3}2_{1}2	P 4_{3} 2_{1} 2	$\Gamma_qD_4^8$	49a	$(c:a:a):4_3$ $2_1$	$(4_1{*}2_1)$
97	422	$224$	I422	I 4 2 2	$\Gamma_q^vD_4^9$	31s	$\left ( \tfrac{a+b+c}{2}/c:a:a\right ) :4:2$	$(*4_24_02_1)$
98	422	$224$	I4_{1}22	I 4_{1} 2 2	$\Gamma_q^vD_4^{10}$	46a	$\left ( \tfrac{a+b+c}{2}/c:a:a\right ) :4:2_1$	$(*4_34_12_0)$
99	4mm	$*44$	P4mm	P 4 m m	$\Gamma_qC_{4v}^1$	24s	$(c:a:a):4\cdot m$	$(*{\cdot}4{\cdot}4{\cdot}2)$
100	4mm	$*44$	P4bm	P 4 b m	$\Gamma_qC_{4v}^2$	26h	$(c:a:a):4\odot \tilde a$	$(4_0{*}{\cdot}2)$
101	4mm	$*44$	P4_{2}cm	P 4_{2} c m	$\Gamma_qC_{4v}^3$	37a	$(c:a:a):4_2\cdot \tilde c$	$(*{:}4{\cdot}4{:}2)$
102	4mm	$*44$	P4_{2}nm	P 4_{2} n m	$\Gamma_qC_{4v}^4$	38a	$(c:a:a):4_2\odot \widetilde{ac}$	$(4_2{*}{\cdot}2)$
103	4mm	$*44$	P4cc	P 4 c c	$\Gamma_qC_{4v}^5$	25h	$(c:a:a):4\cdot \tilde c$	$(*{:}4{:}4{:}2)$
104	4mm	$*44$	P4nc	P 4 n c	$\Gamma_qC_{4v}^6$	27h	$(c:a:a):4\odot \widetilde{ac}$	$(4_0{*}{:}2)$
105	4mm	$*44$	P4_{2}mc	P 4_{2} m c	$\Gamma_qC_{4v}^7$	36a	$(c:a:a):4_2\cdot m$	$(*{\cdot}4{:}4{\cdot}2)$
106	4mm	$*44$	P4_{2}bc	P 4_{2} b c	$\Gamma_qC_{4v}^8$	39a	$(c:a:a):4\odot \tilde a$	$(4_2{*}{:}2)$
107	4mm	$*44$	I4mm	I 4 m m	$\Gamma_q^vC_{4v}^9$	25s	$\left ( \tfrac{a+b+c}{2}/c:a:a\right ) :4\cdot m$	$(*{\cdot}4{\cdot}4{:}2)$
108	4mm	$*44$	I4cm	I 4 c m	$\Gamma_q^vC_{4v}^{10}$	28h	$\left ( \tfrac{a+b+c}{2}/c:a:a\right ) :4\cdot \tilde c$	$(*{\cdot}4{:}4{:}2)$
109	4mm	$*44$	I4_{1}md	I 4_{1} m d	$\Gamma_q^vC_{4v}^{11}$	34a	$\left ( \tfrac{a+b+c}{2}/c:a:a\right ) :4_1\odot m$	$(4_1{*}{\cdot}2)$
110	4mm	$*44$	I4_{1}cd	I 4_{1} c d	$\Gamma_q^vC_{4v}^{12}$	35a	$\left ( \tfrac{a+b+c}{2}/c:a:a\right ) :4_1\odot \tilde c$	$(4_1{*}{:}2)$
111	4̅2m	$2{*}2$	P4̅2m	P 4̅ 2 m	$\Gamma_qD_{2d}^1$	32s	$(c:a:a):\tilde 4 :2$	$(*4{\cdot}42_0)$
112	4̅2m	$2{*}2$	P4̅2c	P 4̅ 2 c	$\Gamma_qD_{2d}^2$	30h	$(c:a:a):\tilde 4$ $2$	$(*4{:}42_0)$
113	4̅2m	$2{*}2$	P4̅2_{1}m	P 4̅ 2_{1} m	$\Gamma_qD_{2d}^3$	52a	$(c:a:a):\tilde 4 \cdot \widetilde{ab}$	$(4\bar{*}{\cdot}2)$
114	4̅2m	$2{*}2$	P4̅2_{1}c	P 4̅ 2_{1} c	$\Gamma_qD_{2d}^4$	53a	$(c:a:a):\tilde 4 \cdot \widetilde{abc}$	$(4\bar{*}{:}2)$
115	4̅2m	$2{*}2$	P4̅m2	P 4̅ m 2	$\Gamma_qD_{2d}^5$	33s	$(c:a:a):\tilde 4 \cdot m$	$(*{\cdot}44{\cdot}2)$
116	4̅2m	$2{*}2$	P4̅c2	P 4̅ c 2	$\Gamma_qD_{2d}^6$	31h	$(c:a:a):\tilde 4 \cdot \tilde c$	$(*{:}44{:}2)$
117	4̅2m	$2{*}2$	P4̅b2	P 4̅ b 2	$\Gamma_qD_{2d}^7$	32h	$(c:a:a):\tilde 4 \odot \tilde a$	$(4\bar{*}_02_0)$
118	4̅2m	$2{*}2$	P4̅n2	P 4̅ n 2	$\Gamma_qD_{2d}^8$	33h	$(c:a:a):\tilde 4 \cdot \widetilde{ac}$	$(4\bar{*}_12_0)$
119	4̅2m	$2{*}2$	I4̅m2	I 4̅ m 2	$\Gamma_q^vD_{2d}^9$	35s	$\left ( \tfrac{a+b+c}{2}/c:a:a\right ) :\tilde 4 \cdot m$	$(*4{\cdot}42_1)$
120	4̅2m	$2{*}2$	I4̅c2	I 4̅ c 2	$\Gamma_q^vD_{2d}^{10}$	34h	$\left ( \tfrac{a+b+c}{2}/c:a:a\right ) :\tilde 4 \cdot \tilde c$	$(*4{:}42_1)$
121	4̅2m	$2{*}2$	I4̅2m	I 4̅ 2 m	$\Gamma_q^vD_{2d}^{11}$	34s	$\left ( \tfrac{a+b+c}{2}/c:a:a\right ) :\tilde 4 :2$	$(*{\cdot}44{:}2)$
122	4̅2m	$2{*}2$	I4̅2d	I 4̅ 2 d	$\Gamma_q^vD_{2d}^{12}$	51a	$\left ( \tfrac{a+b+c}{2}/c:a:a\right ) :\tilde 4 \odot \tfrac{1}{2}\widetilde{abc}$	$(4\bar{*}2_1)$
123	4/m 2/m 2/m (4/mmm)	$*224$	P4/mmm	P 4/m 2/m 2/m	$\Gamma_qD_{4h}^1$	36s	$(c:a:a)\cdot m:4\cdot m$	$[*{\cdot}4{\cdot}4{\cdot}2]$
124	4/m 2/m 2/m (4/mmm)	$*224$	P4/mcc	P 4/m 2/c 2/c	$\Gamma_qD_{4h}^2$	35h	$(c:a:a)\cdot m:4\cdot \tilde c$	$[*{:}4{:}4{:}2]$
125	4/m 2/m 2/m (4/mmm)	$*224$	P4/nbm	P 4/n 2/b 2/m	$\Gamma_qD_{4h}^3$	36h	$(c:a:a)\cdot \widetilde{ab}:4\odot \tilde a$	$(*4_04{\cdot}2)$
126	4/m 2/m 2/m (4/mmm)	$*224$	P4/nnc	P 4/n 2/n 2/c	$\Gamma_qD_{4h}^4$	37h	$(c:a:a)\cdot \widetilde{ab}:4\odot \widetilde{ac}$	$(*4_04{:}2)$
127	4/m 2/m 2/m (4/mmm)	$*224$	P4/mbm	P 4/m 2_{1}/b 2/m	$\Gamma_qD_{4h}^5$	54a	$(c:a:a)\cdot m:4\odot \tilde a$	$[4_0{*}{\cdot}2]$
128	4/m 2/m 2/m (4/mmm)	$*224$	P4/mnc	P 4/m 2_{1}/n 2/c	$\Gamma_qD_{4h}^6$	56a	$(c:a:a)\cdot m:4\odot \widetilde{ac}$	$[4_0{*}{:}2]$
129	4/m 2/m 2/m (4/mmm)	$*224$	P4/nmm	P 4/n 2_{1}/m 2/m	$\Gamma_qD_{4h}^7$	55a	$(c:a:a)\cdot \widetilde{ab}:4\cdot m$	$(*4{\cdot}4{\cdot}2)$
130	4/m 2/m 2/m (4/mmm)	$*224$	P4/ncc	P 4/n 2_{1}/c 2/c	$\Gamma_qD_{4h}^8$	57a	$(c:a:a)\cdot \widetilde{ab}:4\cdot \tilde c$	$(*4{:}4{:}2)$
131	4/m 2/m 2/m (4/mmm)	$*224$	P4_{2}/mmc	P 4_{2}/m 2/m 2/c	$\Gamma_qD_{4h}^9$	60a	$(c:a:a)\cdot m:4_2\cdot m$	$[*{\cdot}4{:}4{\cdot}2]$
132	4/m 2/m 2/m (4/mmm)	$*224$	P4_{2}/mcm	P 4_{2}/m 2/c 2/m	$\Gamma_qD_{4h}^{10}$	61a	$(c:a:a)\cdot m:4_2\cdot \tilde c$	$[*{:}4{\cdot}4{:}2]$
133	4/m 2/m 2/m (4/mmm)	$*224$	P4_{2}/nbc	P 4_{2}/n 2/b 2/c	$\Gamma_qD_{4h}^{11}$	63a	$(c:a:a)\cdot \widetilde{ab}:4_2\odot \tilde a$	$(*4_24{:}2)$
134	4/m 2/m 2/m (4/mmm)	$*224$	P4_{2}/nnm	P 4_{2}/n 2/n 2/m	$\Gamma_qD_{4h}^{12}$	62a	$(c:a:a)\cdot \widetilde{ab}:4_2\odot \widetilde{ac}$	$(*4_24{\cdot}2)$
135	4/m 2/m 2/m (4/mmm)	$*224$	P4_{2}/mbc	P 4_{2}/m 2_{1}/b 2/c	$\Gamma_qD_{4h}^{13}$	66a	$(c:a:a)\cdot m:4_2\odot \tilde a$	$[4_2{*}{:}2]$
136	4/m 2/m 2/m (4/mmm)	$*224$	P4_{2}/mnm	P 4_{2}/m 2_{1}/n 2/m	$\Gamma_qD_{4h}^{14}$	65a	$(c:a:a)\cdot m:4_2\odot \widetilde{ac}$	$[4_2{*}{\cdot}2]$
137	4/m 2/m 2/m (4/mmm)	$*224$	P4_{2}/nmc	P 4_{2}/n 2_{1}/m 2/c	$\Gamma_qD_{4h}^{15}$	67a	$(c:a:a)\cdot \widetilde{ab}:4_2\cdot m$	$(*4{\cdot}4{:}2)$
138	4/m 2/m 2/m (4/mmm)	$*224$	P4_{2}/ncm	P 4_{2}/n 2_{1}/c 2/m	$\Gamma_qD_{4h}^{16}$	65a	$(c:a:a)\cdot \widetilde{ab}:4_2\cdot \tilde c$	$(*4{:}4{\cdot}2)$
139	4/m 2/m 2/m (4/mmm)	$*224$	I4/mmm	I 4/m 2/m 2/m	$\Gamma_q^vD_{4h}^{17}$	37s	$\left ( \tfrac{a+b+c}{2}/c:a:a\right ) \cdot m:4\cdot m$	$[*{\cdot}4{\cdot}4{:}2]$
140	4/m 2/m 2/m (4/mmm)	$*224$	I4/mcm	I 4/m 2/c 2/m	$\Gamma_q^vD_{4h}^{18}$	38h	$\left ( \tfrac{a+b+c}{2}/c:a:a\right ) \cdot m:4\cdot \tilde c$	$[*{\cdot}4{:}4{:}2]$
141	4/m 2/m 2/m (4/mmm)	$*224$	I4_{1}/amd	I 4_{1}/a 2/m 2/d	$\Gamma_q^vD_{4h}^{19}$	59a	$\left ( \tfrac{a+b+c}{2}/c:a:a\right ) \cdot \tilde a :4_1\odot m$	$(*4_14{\cdot}2)$
142	4/m 2/m 2/m (4/mmm)	$*224$	I4_{1}/acd	I 4_{1}/a 2/c 2/d	$\Gamma_q^vD_{4h}^{20}$	58a	$\left ( \tfrac{a+b+c}{2}/c:a:a\right ) \cdot \tilde a :4_1\odot \tilde c$	$(*4_14{:}2)$

== List of trigonal ==
Trigonal Bravais lattice
Rhombohedral (R)	Hexagonal (P)

Trigonal crystal system
Number	Point group	Orbifold	Short name	Full name	Schoenflies	Fedorov	Shubnikov	Fibrifold
143	3	$33$	P3	P 3	$\Gamma_hC_3^1$	38s	$(c:(a/a)):3$	$(3_03_03_0)$
144	3	$33$	P3_{1}	P 3_{1}	$\Gamma_hC_3^2$	68a	$(c:(a/a)):3_1$	$(3_13_13_1)$
145	3	$33$	P3_{2}	P 3_{2}	$\Gamma_hC_3^3$	69a	$(c:(a/a)):3_2$	$(3_13_13_1)$
146	3	$33$	R3	R 3	$\Gamma_{rh}C_3^4$	39s	$(a/a/a)/3$	$(3_03_13_2)$
147	3̅	$3\times$	P3̅	P 3̅	$\Gamma_hC_{3i}^1$	51s	$(c:(a/a)):\tilde 6$	$(63_02)$
148	3̅	$3\times$	R3̅	R 3̅	$\Gamma_{rh}C_{3i}^2$	52s	$(a/a/a)/\tilde 6$	$(63_12)$
149	32	$223$	P312	P 3 1 2	$\Gamma_hD_3^1$	45s	$(c:(a/a)):2:3$	$(*3_03_03_0)$
150	32	$223$	P321	P 3 2 1	$\Gamma_hD_3^2$	44s	$(c:(a/a))\cdot 2:3$	$(3_0{*}3_0)$
151	32	$223$	P3_{1}12	P 3_{1} 1 2	$\Gamma_hD_3^3$	72a	$(c:(a/a)):2:3_1$	$(*3_13_13_1)$
152	32	$223$	P3_{1}21	P 3_{1} 2 1	$\Gamma_hD_3^4$	70a	$(c:(a/a))\cdot 2:3_1$	$(3_1{*}3_1)$
153	32	$223$	P3_{2}12	P 3_{2} 1 2	$\Gamma_hD_3^5$	73a	$(c:(a/a)):2:3_2$	$(*3_13_13_1)$
154	32	$223$	P3_{2}21	P 3_{2} 2 1	$\Gamma_hD_3^6$	71a	$(c:(a/a))\cdot 2:3_2$	$(3_1{*}3_1)$
155	32	$223$	R32	R 3 2	$\Gamma_{rh}D_3^7$	46s	$(a/a/a)/3:2$	$(*3_03_13_2)$
156	3m	$*33$	P3m1	P 3 m 1	$\Gamma_hC_{3v}^1$	40s	$(c:(a/a)):m\cdot 3$	$(*{\cdot}3{\cdot}3{\cdot}3)$
157	3m	$*33$	P31m	P 3 1 m	$\Gamma_hC_{3v}^2$	41s	$(c:(a/a))\cdot m\cdot 3$	$(3_0{*}{\cdot}3)$
158	3m	$*33$	P3c1	P 3 c 1	$\Gamma_hC_{3v}^3$	39h	$(c:(a/a)):\tilde c:3$	$(*{:}3{:}3{:}3)$
159	3m	$*33$	P31c	P 3 1 c	$\Gamma_hC_{3v}^4$	40h	$(c:(a/a))\cdot\tilde c :3$	$(3_0{*}{:}3)$
160	3m	$*33$	R3m	R 3 m	$\Gamma_{rh}C_{3v}^5$	42s	$(a/a/a)/3\cdot m$	$(3_1{*}{\cdot}3)$
161	3m	$*33$	R3c	R 3 c	$\Gamma_{rh}C_{3v}^6$	41h	$(a/a/a)/3\cdot\tilde c$	$(3_1{*}{:}3)$
162	3̅ 2/m (3̅m)	$2{*}3$	P3̅1m	P 3̅ 1 2/m	$\Gamma_hD_{3d}^1$	56s	$(c:(a/a))\cdot m\cdot\tilde 6$	$(*{\cdot}63_02)$
163	3̅ 2/m (3̅m)	$2{*}3$	P3̅1c	P 3̅ 1 2/c	$\Gamma_hD_{3d}^2$	46h	$(c:(a/a))\cdot\tilde c \cdot\tilde 6$	$(*{:}63_02)$
164	3̅ 2/m (3̅m)	$2{*}3$	P3̅m1	P 3̅ 2/m 1	$\Gamma_hD_{3d}^3$	55s	$(c:(a/a)):m\cdot\tilde 6$	$(*6{\cdot}3{\cdot}2)$
165	3̅ 2/m (3̅m)	$2{*}3$	P3̅c1	P 3̅ 2/c 1	$\Gamma_hD_{3d}^4$	45h	$(c:(a/a)):\tilde c \cdot\tilde 6$	$(*6{:}3{:}2)$
166	3̅ 2/m (3̅m)	$2{*}3$	R3̅m	R 3̅ 2/m	$\Gamma_{rh}D_{3d}^5$	57s	$(a/a/a)/\tilde 6 \cdot m$	$(*{\cdot}63_12)$
167	3̅ 2/m (3̅m)	$2{*}3$	R3̅c	R 3̅ 2/c	$\Gamma_{rh}D_{3d}^6$	47h	$(a/a/a)/\tilde 6 \cdot\tilde c$	$(*{:}63_12)$

== List of hexagonal ==
Hexagonal Bravais lattice

Hexagonal crystal system
Number	Point group	Orbifold	Short name	Full name	Schoenflies	Fedorov	Shubnikov	Fibrifold
168	6	$66$	P6	P 6	$\Gamma_hC_6^1$	49s	$(c:(a/a)):6$	$(6_03_02_0)$
169	6	$66$	P6_{1}	P 6_{1}	$\Gamma_hC_6^2$	74a	$(c:(a/a)):6_1$	$(6_13_12_1)$
170	6	$66$	P6_{5}	P 6_{5}	$\Gamma_hC_6^3$	75a	$(c:(a/a)):6_5$	$(6_13_12_1)$
171	6	$66$	P6_{2}	P 6_{2}	$\Gamma_hC_6^4$	76a	$(c:(a/a)):6_2$	$(6_23_22_0)$
172	6	$66$	P6_{4}	P 6_{4}	$\Gamma_hC_6^5$	77a	$(c:(a/a)):6_4$	$(6_23_22_0)$
173	6	$66$	P6_{3}	P 6_{3}	$\Gamma_hC_6^6$	78a	$(c:(a/a)):6_3$	$(6_33_02_1)$
174	6̅	$3*$	P6̅	P 6̅	$\Gamma_hC_{3h}^1$	43s	$(c:(a/a)):3:m$	$[3_03_03_0]$
175	6/m	$6*$	P6/m	P 6/m	$\Gamma_hC_{6h}^1$	53s	$(c:(a/a))\cdot m :6$	$[6_03_02_0]$
176	6/m	$6*$	P6_{3}/m	P 6_{3}/m	$\Gamma_hC_{6h}^2$	81a	$(c:(a/a))\cdot m :6_3$	$[6_33_02_1]$
177	622	$226$	P622	P 6 2 2	$\Gamma_hD_6^1$	54s	$(c:(a/a))\cdot 2 :6$	$(*6_03_02_0)$
178	622	$226$	P6_{1}22	P 6_{1} 2 2	$\Gamma_hD_6^2$	82a	$(c:(a/a))\cdot 2 :6_1$	$(*6_13_12_1)$
179	622	$226$	P6_{5}22	P 6_{5} 2 2	$\Gamma_hD_6^3$	83a	$(c:(a/a))\cdot 2 :6_5$	$(*6_13_12_1)$
180	622	$226$	P6_{2}22	P 6_{2} 2 2	$\Gamma_hD_6^4$	84a	$(c:(a/a))\cdot 2 :6_2$	$(*6_23_22_0)$
181	622	$226$	P6_{4}22	P 6_{4} 2 2	$\Gamma_hD_6^5$	85a	$(c:(a/a))\cdot 2 :6_4$	$(*6_23_22_0)$
182	622	$226$	P6_{3}22	P 6_{3} 2 2	$\Gamma_hD_6^6$	86a	$(c:(a/a))\cdot 2 :6_3$	$(*6_33_02_1)$
183	6mm	$*66$	P6mm	P 6 m m	$\Gamma_hC_{6v}^1$	50s	$(c:(a/a)):m\cdot 6$	$(*{\cdot}6{\cdot}3{\cdot}2)$
184	6mm	$*66$	P6cc	P 6 c c	$\Gamma_hC_{6v}^2$	44h	$(c:(a/a)):\tilde c \cdot 6$	$(*{:}6{:}3{:}2)$
185	6mm	$*66$	P6_{3}cm	P 6_{3} c m	$\Gamma_hC_{6v}^3$	80a	$(c:(a/a)):\tilde c \cdot 6_3$	$(*{\cdot}6{:}3{:}2)$
186	6mm	$*66$	P6_{3}mc	P 6_{3} m c	$\Gamma_hC_{6v}^4$	79a	$(c:(a/a)):m\cdot 6_3$	$(*{:}6{\cdot}3{\cdot}2)$
187	6̅m2	$*223$	P6̅m2	P 6̅ m 2	$\Gamma_hD_{3h}^1$	48s	$(c:(a/a)):m\cdot 3:m$	$[*{\cdot}3{\cdot}3{\cdot}3]$
188	6̅m2	$*223$	P6̅c2	P 6̅ c 2	$\Gamma_hD_{3h}^2$	43h	$(c:(a/a)):\tilde c \cdot 3:m$	$[*{:}3{:}3{:}3]$
189	6̅m2	$*223$	P6̅2m	P 6̅ 2 m	$\Gamma_hD_{3h}^3$	47s	$(c:(a/a))\cdot m:3\cdot m$	$[3_0{*}{\cdot}3]$
190	6̅m2	$*223$	P6̅2c	P 6̅ 2 c	$\Gamma_hD_{3h}^4$	42h	$(c:(a/a))\cdot m:3\cdot \tilde c$	$[3_0{*}{:}3]$
191	6/m 2/m 2/m (6/mmm)	$*226$	P6/mmm	P 6/m 2/m 2/m	$\Gamma_hD_{6h}^1$	58s	$(c:(a/a))\cdot m:6\cdot m$	$[*{\cdot}6{\cdot}3{\cdot}2]$
192	6/m 2/m 2/m (6/mmm)	$*226$	P6/mcc	P 6/m 2/c 2/c	$\Gamma_hD_{6h}^2$	48h	$(c:(a/a))\cdot m:6\cdot\tilde c$	$[*{:}6{:}3{:}2]$
193	6/m 2/m 2/m (6/mmm)	$*226$	P6_{3}/mcm	P 6_{3}/m 2/c 2/m	$\Gamma_hD_{6h}^3$	87a	$(c:(a/a))\cdot m:6_3\cdot\tilde c$	$[*{\cdot}6{:}3{:}2]$
194	6/m 2/m 2/m (6/mmm)	$*226$	P6_{3}/mmc	P 6_{3}/m 2/m 2/c	$\Gamma_hD_{6h}^4$	88a	$(c:(a/a))\cdot m:6_3\cdot m$	$[*{:}6{\cdot}3{\cdot}2]$

== List of cubic ==
Cubic Bravais lattice
Simple (P)	Body centered (I)	Face centered (F)

Example cubic structures
(221) Caesium chloride. Different colors for the two atom types.

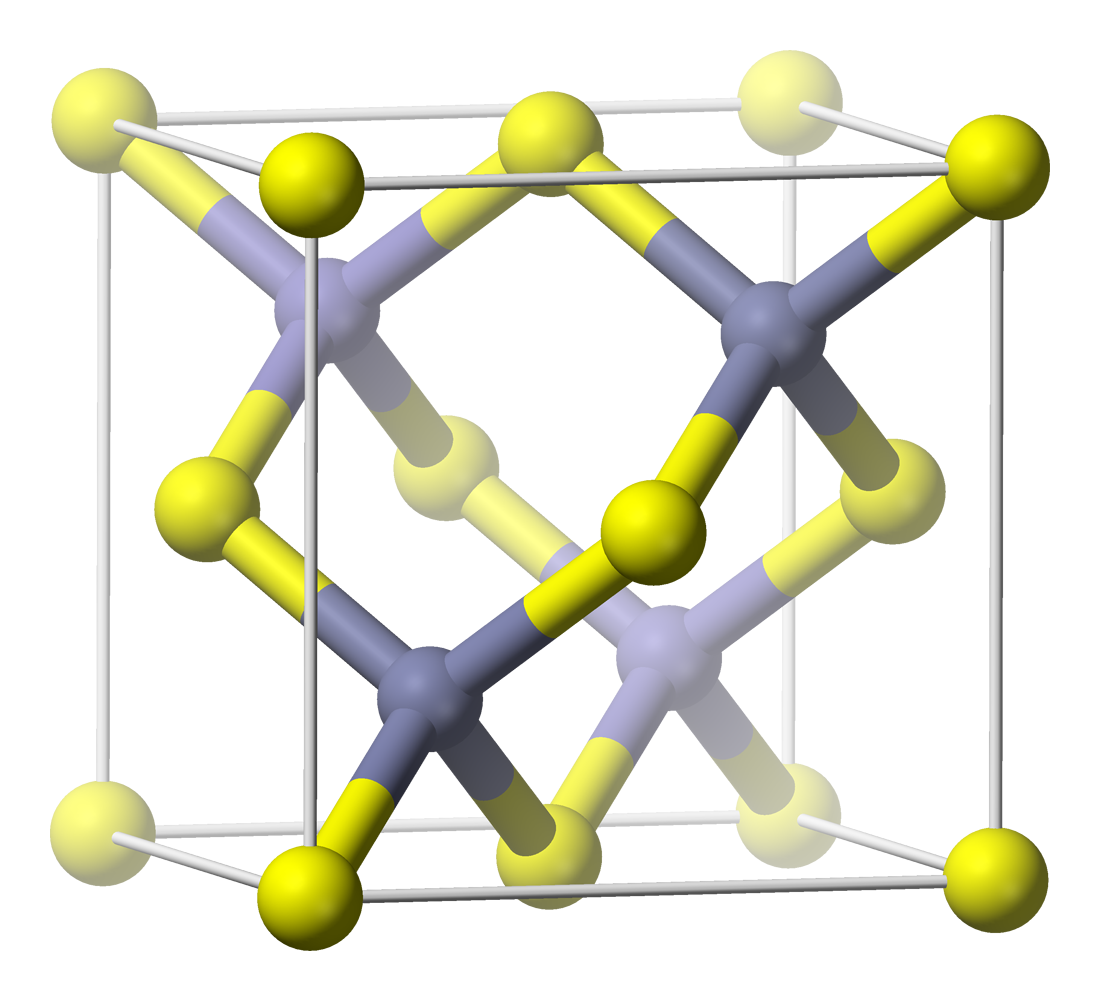
(216) Sphalerite

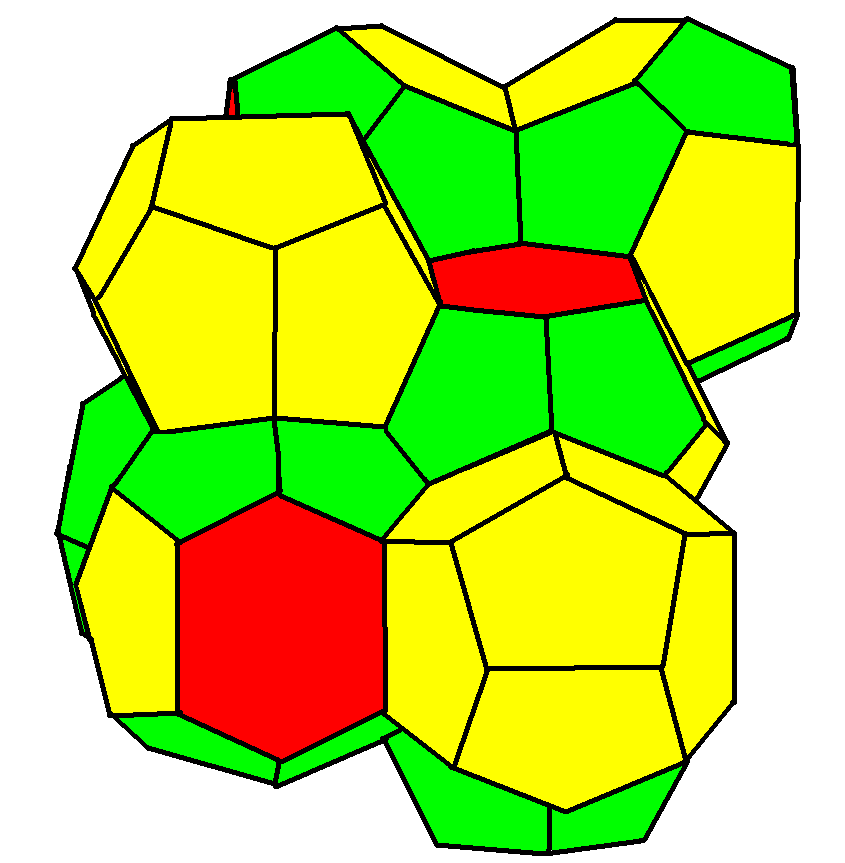
(223) Weaire–Phelan structure

Cubic crystal system
Number	Point group	Orbifold	Short name	Full name	Schoenflies	Fedorov	Shubnikov	Conway	Fibrifold (preserving $z$)	Fibrifold (preserving $x$, $y$, $z$)
195	23	$332$	P23	P 2 3	$\Gamma_cT^1$	59s	$\left ( a:a:a\right ) :2/3$	$2^\circ$	$(*2_02_02_02_0){:}3$	$(*2_02_02_02_0){:}3$
196	23	$332$	F23	F 2 3	$\Gamma_c^fT^2$	61s	$\left ( \tfrac{a+c}{2}/\tfrac{b+c}{2}/\tfrac{a+b}{2}:a:a:a\right ) :2/3$	$1^\circ$	$(*2_02_12_02_1){:}3$	$(*2_02_12_02_1){:}3$
197	23	$332$	I23	I 2 3	$\Gamma_c^vT^3$	60s	$\left ( \tfrac{a+b+c}{2}/a:a:a\right ) :2/3$	$4^{\circ\circ}$	$(2_1{*}2_02_0){:}3$	$(2_1{*}2_02_0){:}3$
198	23	$332$	P2_{1}3	P 2_{1} 3	$\Gamma_cT^4$	89a	$\left ( a:a:a\right ) :2_1/3$	$1^\circ/4$	$(2_12_1\bar{\times}){:}3$	$(2_12_1\bar{\times}){:}3$
199	23	$332$	I2_{1}3	I 2_{1} 3	$\Gamma_c^vT^5$	90a	$\left ( \tfrac{a+b+c}{2}/a:a:a\right ) :2_1/3$	$2^\circ/4$	$(2_0{*}2_12_1){:}3$	$(2_0{*}2_12_1){:}3$
200	2/m 3̅ (m3̅)	$3{*}2$	Pm3̅	P 2/m 3̅	$\Gamma_cT_h^1$	62s	$\left ( a:a:a\right ) \cdot m/ \tilde 6$	$4^-$	$[*{\cdot}2{\cdot}2{\cdot}2{\cdot}2]{:}3$	$[*{\cdot}2{\cdot}2{\cdot}2{\cdot}2]{:}3$
201	2/m 3̅ (m3̅)	$3{*}2$	Pn3̅	P 2/n 3̅	$\Gamma_cT_h^2$	49h	$\left ( a:a:a\right ) \cdot \widetilde{ab} / \tilde 6$	$4^{\circ+}$	$(2\bar{*}_12_02_0){:}3$	$(2\bar{*}_12_02_0){:}3$
202	2/m 3̅ (m3̅)	$3{*}2$	Fm3̅	F 2/m 3̅	$\Gamma_c^fT_h^3$	64s	$\left ( \tfrac{a+c}{2}/\tfrac{b+c}{2}/\tfrac{a+b}{2}:a:a:a\right ) \cdot m/ \tilde 6$	$2^-$	$[*{\cdot}2{\cdot}2{:}2{:}2]{:}3$	$[*{\cdot}2{\cdot}2{:}2{:}2]{:}3$
203	2/m 3̅ (m3̅)	$3{*}2$	Fd3̅	F 2/d 3̅	$\Gamma_c^fT_h^4$	50h	$\left ( \tfrac{a+c}{2}/\tfrac{b+c}{2}/\tfrac{a+b}{2}:a:a:a\right ) \cdot \tfrac{1}{2}\widetilde{ab} / \tilde 6$	$2^{\circ+}$	$(2\bar{*}2_02_1){:}3$	$(2\bar{*}2_02_1){:}3$
204	2/m 3̅ (m3̅)	$3{*}2$	Im3̅	I 2/m 3̅	$\Gamma_c^vT_h^5$	63s	$\left ( \tfrac{a+b+c}{2}/a:a:a\right ) \cdot m/\tilde 6$	$8^{-\circ}$	$[2_1{*}{\cdot}2{\cdot}2]{:}3$	$[2_1{*}{\cdot}2{\cdot}2]{:}3$
205	2/m 3̅ (m3̅)	$3{*}2$	Pa3̅	P 2_{1}/a 3̅	$\Gamma_cT_h^6$	91a	$\left ( a:a:a\right ) \cdot \tilde a /\tilde 6$	$2^-/4$	$(2_12\bar{*}{:}){:}3$	$(2_12\bar{*}{:}){:}3$
206	2/m 3̅ (m3̅)	$3{*}2$	Ia3̅	I 2_{1}/a 3̅	$\Gamma_c^vT_h^7$	92a	$\left ( \tfrac{a+b+c}{2}/a:a:a\right ) \cdot \tilde a /\tilde 6$	$4^-/4$	$(*2_12{:}2{:}2){:}3$	$(*2_12{:}2{:}2){:}3$
207	432	$432$	P432	P 4 3 2	$\Gamma_cO^1$	68s	$\left ( a:a:a\right ) :4/3$	$4^{\circ-}$	$(*4_04_02_0){:}3$	$(*2_02_02_02_0){:}6$
208	432	$432$	P4_{2}32	P 4_{2} 3 2	$\Gamma_cO^2$	98a	$\left ( a:a:a\right ) :4_2//3$	$4^+$	$(*4_24_22_0){:}3$	$(*2_02_02_02_0){:}6$
209	432	$432$	F432	F 4 3 2	$\Gamma_c^fO^3$	70s	$\left ( \tfrac{a+c}{2}/\tfrac{b+c}{2}/\tfrac{a+b}{2}:a:a:a\right ) :4/3$	$2^{\circ-}$	$(*4_24_02_1){:}3$	$(*2_02_12_02_1){:}6$
210	432	$432$	F4_{1}32	F 4_{1} 3 2	$\Gamma_c^fO^4$	97a	$\left ( \tfrac{a+c}{2}/\tfrac{b+c}{2}/\tfrac{a+b}{2}:a:a:a\right ) :4_1//3$	$2^+$	$(*4_34_12_0){:}3$	$(*2_02_12_02_1){:}6$
211	432	$432$	I432	I 4 3 2	$\Gamma_c^vO^5$	69s	$\left ( \tfrac{a+b+c}{2}/a:a:a\right ) :4/3$	$8^{+\circ}$	$(4_24_02_1){:}3$	$(2_1{*}2_02_0){:}6$
212	432	$432$	P4_{3}32	P 4_{3} 3 2	$\Gamma_cO^6$	94a	$\left ( a:a:a\right ) :4_3//3$	$2^+/4$	$(4_1{*}2_1){:}3$	$(2_12_1\bar{\times}){:}6$
213	432	$432$	P4_{1}32	P 4_{1} 3 2	$\Gamma_cO^7$	95a	$\left ( a:a:a\right ) :4_1//3$	$2^+/4$	$(4_1{*}2_1){:}3$	$(2_12_1\bar{\times}){:}6$
214	432	$432$	I4_{1}32	I 4_{1} 3 2	$\Gamma_c^vO^8$	96a	$\left ( \tfrac{a+b+c}{2}/:a:a:a\right ) :4_1//3$	$4^+/4$	$(*4_34_12_0){:}3$	$(2_0{*}2_12_1){:}6$
215	4̅3m	$*332$	P4̅3m	P 4̅ 3 m	$\Gamma_cT_d^1$	65s	$\left ( a:a:a\right ) :\tilde 4 /3$	$2^\circ{:}2$	$(*4{\cdot}42_0){:}3$	$(*2_02_02_02_0){:}6$
216	4̅3m	$*332$	F4̅3m	F 4̅ 3 m	$\Gamma_c^fT_d^2$	67s	$\left ( \tfrac{a+c}{2}/\tfrac{b+c}{2}/\tfrac{a+b}{2}:a:a:a\right ) :\tilde 4 /3$	$1^\circ{:}2$	$(*4{\cdot}42_1){:}3$	$(*2_02_12_02_1){:}6$
217	4̅3m	$*332$	I4̅3m	I 4̅ 3 m	$\Gamma_c^vT_d^3$	66s	$\left ( \tfrac{a+b+c}{2}/a:a:a\right ) :\tilde 4 /3$	$4^\circ{:}2$	$(*{\cdot}44{:}2){:}3$	$(2_1{*}2_02_0){:}6$
218	4̅3m	$*332$	P4̅3n	P 4̅ 3 n	$\Gamma_cT_d^4$	51h	$\left ( a:a:a\right ) :\tilde 4 //3$	$4^\circ$	$(*4{:}42_0){:}3$	$(*2_02_02_02_0){:}6$
219	4̅3m	$*332$	F4̅3c	F 4̅ 3 c	$\Gamma_c^fT_d^5$	52h	$\left ( \tfrac{a+c}{2}/\tfrac{b+c}{2}/\tfrac{a+b}{2}:a:a:a\right ) :\tilde 4 //3$	$2^{\circ\circ}$	$(*4{:}42_1){:}3$	$(*2_02_12_02_1){:}6$
220	4̅3m	$*332$	I4̅3d	I 4̅ 3 d	$\Gamma_c^vT_d^6$	93a	$\left ( \tfrac{a+b+c}{2}/a:a:a\right ) :\tilde 4 //3$	$4^\circ/4$	$(4\bar{*}2_1){:}3$	$(2_0{*}2_12_1){:}6$
221	4/m 3̅ 2/m (m3̅m)	$*432$	Pm3̅m	P 4/m 3̅ 2/m	$\Gamma_cO_h^1$	71s	$\left ( a:a:a\right ) :4/\tilde 6 \cdot m$	$4^-{:}2$	$[*{\cdot}4{\cdot}4{\cdot}2]{:}3$	$[*{\cdot}2{\cdot}2{\cdot}2{\cdot}2]{:}6$
222	4/m 3̅ 2/m (m3̅m)	$*432$	Pn3̅n	P 4/n 3̅ 2/n	$\Gamma_cO_h^2$	53h	$\left ( a:a:a\right ) :4/\tilde 6 \cdot \widetilde{abc}$	$8^{\circ\circ}$	$(*4_04{:}2){:}3$	$(2\bar{*}_12_02_0){:}6$
223	4/m 3̅ 2/m (m3̅m)	$*432$	Pm3̅n	P 4_{2}/m 3̅ 2/n	$\Gamma_cO_h^3$	102a	$\left ( a:a:a\right ) :4_2//\tilde 6 \cdot \widetilde{abc}$	$8^\circ$	$[*{\cdot}4{:}4{\cdot}2]{:}3$	$[*{\cdot}2{\cdot}2{\cdot}2{\cdot}2]{:}6$
224	4/m 3̅ 2/m (m3̅m)	$*432$	Pn3̅m	P 4_{2}/n 3̅ 2/m	$\Gamma_cO_h^4$	103a	$\left ( a:a:a\right ) :4_2//\tilde 6 \cdot m$	$4^+{:}2$	$(*4_24{\cdot}2){:}3$	$(2\bar{*}_12_02_0){:}6$
225	4/m 3̅ 2/m (m3̅m)	$*432$	Fm3̅m	F 4/m 3̅ 2/m	$\Gamma_c^fO_h^5$	73s	$\left ( \tfrac{a+c}{2}/\tfrac{b+c}{2}/\tfrac{a+b}{2}:a:a:a\right ) :4/\tilde 6 \cdot m$	$2^-{:}2$	$[*{\cdot}4{\cdot}4{:}2]{:}3$	$[*{\cdot}2{\cdot}2{:}2{:}2]{:}6$
226	4/m 3̅ 2/m (m3̅m)	$*432$	Fm3̅c	F 4/m 3̅ 2/c	$\Gamma_c^fO_h^6$	54h	$\left ( \tfrac{a+c}{2}/\tfrac{b+c}{2}/\tfrac{a+b}{2}:a:a:a\right ) :4/\tilde 6 \cdot \tilde c$	$4^{--}$	$[*{\cdot}4{:}4{:}2]{:}3$	$[*{\cdot}2{\cdot}2{:}2{:}2]{:}6$
227	4/m 3̅ 2/m (m3̅m)	$*432$	Fd3̅m	F 4_{1}/d 3̅ 2/m	$\Gamma_c^fO_h^7$	100a	$\left ( \tfrac{a+c}{2}/\tfrac{b+c}{2}/\tfrac{a+b}{2}:a:a:a\right ) :4_1//\tilde 6 \cdot m$	$2^+{:}2$	$(*4_14{\cdot}2){:}3$	$(2\bar{*}2_02_1){:}6$
228	4/m 3̅ 2/m (m3̅m)	$*432$	Fd3̅c	F 4_{1}/d 3̅ 2/c	$\Gamma_c^fO_h^8$	101a	$\left ( \tfrac{a+c}{2}/\tfrac{b+c}{2}/\tfrac{a+b}{2}:a:a:a\right ) :4_1//\tilde 6 \cdot \tilde c$	$4^{++}$	$(*4_14{:}2){:}3$	$(2\bar{*}2_02_1){:}6$
229	4/m 3̅ 2/m (m3̅m)	$*432$	Im3̅m	I 4/m 3̅ 2/m	$\Gamma_c^vO_h^9$	72s	$\left ( \tfrac{a+b+c}{2}/a:a:a\right ) :4/\tilde 6 \cdot m$	$8^\circ{:}2$	$[*{\cdot}4{\cdot}4{:}2]{:}3$	$[2_1{*}{\cdot}2{\cdot}2]{:}6$
230	4/m 3̅ 2/m (m3̅m)	$*432$	Ia3̅d	I 4_{1}/a 3̅ 2/d	$\Gamma_c^vO_h^{10}$	99a	$\left ( \tfrac{a+b+c}{2}/a:a:a\right ) :4_1//\tilde 6 \cdot \tfrac{1}{2}\widetilde{abc}$	$8^\circ/4$	$(*4_14{:}2){:}3$	$(*2_12{:}2{:}2){:}6$
