= Blood gas test =

Medical measurement

- Purpose: measure blood gas tension values

A blood gas test or blood gas analysis tests blood to measure blood gas tension values and blood pH. It also measures the level and base excess of bicarbonate. The source of the blood is reflected in the name of each test; arterial blood gases come from arteries, venous blood gases come from veins and capillary blood gases come from capillaries. The blood gas tension levels of partial pressures can be used as indicators of ventilation, respiration and oxygenation. Analysis of paired arterial and venous specimens can give insights into the aetiology of acidosis in the newborn.

== Values measured ==
Blood samples for testing are taken from arterial blood by a radial artery puncture, and from venous blood by venipuncture. Samples of capillary blood are taken using a lancet and capillary action. Capillary samples from the earlobe or the fingertip can be used to predict blood pH and the arterial partial pressure of carbon dioxide in the blood. Samples from the earlobe are seen to be a more appropriate site for the prediction of the arterial partial pressure of oxygen.

Blood gas tests also measure the levels of bicarbonate and standard bicarbonate, base excess, oxygen saturation, and pH. Typically, an arterial blood gas test is used more often than venous blood gas tests.

== Clinical significance ==
Blood gas tests can be used in the diagnosis of a number of acidosis conditions such as lactic, metabolic, and respiratory acidosis, diabetic ketoacidosis, and also of respiratory alkalosis. Particularly, umbilical cord blood gas analysis can give an indication of preceding fetal hypoxic stress. In combination with other clinical information, normal paired arterial and venous cord blood gas results can usually provide a robust defence against a suggestion that an infant had an intrapartum hypoxic-ischaemic event.

Abnormal results may be due to a wide range of diseases, including poisoning and trauma as well as lung, kidney, or metabolic diseases. Drug overdose and uncontrolled diabetes may be determined from abnormal results. Head, neck or injuries that affect breathing can also lead to abnormal results.
