= Winters's formula =

Respiratory compensation formula

Winters's formula, named after R. W. Winters, is a formula used to evaluate respiratory compensation when analyzing acid-base disorders in the presence of metabolic acidosis. It can be given as:

$$P_{\ce{CO2}} = \left(1.5 \times\left[\ce{HCO3^-}\right]\right) + 8 \pm 2$$,

where HCO_{3}^{−} is given in units of mEq/L and P_{CO_{2}} will be in units of mmHg.

== History ==
R. W. Winters was an American physician and graduate from Yale Medical School. He was a professor of pediatrics at Columbia University College of Physicians and Surgeons. In 1974 he was awarded the Borden Award gold medal by the American Academy of Pediatrics.

Winters conducted an experiment in the 1960s on 60 patients with varying degrees of metabolic acidosis. He aimed to empirically determine a mathematical expression representing the effect of respiratory compensation during metabolic acidosis. He measured the blood pH, plasma P_{CO_{2}}, blood base excess, and plasma bicarbonate concentrations. He focused on the relationship between plasma P_{CO_{2}} and plasma bicarbonate. Winter's Formula was derived from a linear regression of this relationship between plasma P_{CO_{2}} and plasma bicarbonate.

== Physiology ==
There are four primary acid-base derangements that can occur in the human body - metabolic acidosis, metabolic alkalosis, respiratory acidosis, and respiratory alkalosis. These are characterized by a serum pH below 7.4 (acidosis) or above 7.4 (alkalosis), and whether the cause is from a metabolic process or respiratory process. If the body experiences one of these derangements, the body will try to compensate by inducing an opposite process (e.g. induced respiratory alkalosis for a primary metabolic acidosis).

Respiratory compensation is one of three major processes the body uses to react to derangements in acid-base status (above or below pH 7.4). It is slower than the initial bicarbonate buffer system in the blood, but faster than renal compensation. Respiratory compensation usually begins within minutes to hours, but alone will not completely return arterial pH to a normal value (7.4). Winter's Formula quantifies the amount of respiratory compensation during metabolic acidosis.

During metabolic acidosis, a decrease in pH stimulates chemoreceptors. Peripheral chemoreceptors are found in the aortic and carotid bodies and respond to changes in the Pa_{CO_{2}}, the arterial partial pressure of carbon dioxide. Central chemoreceptors are found in the brainstem and respond primarily to decreased pH in the cerebrospinal fluid. In response to decreased pH, these chemoreceptors lead to an increase in minute ventilation and increased elimination of carbon dioxide. A decrease in carbon dioxide lowers Pa_{CO_{2}} and pushes arterial pH towards normal.

== Clinical use ==
One difficulty in evaluation acid-base derangements is the presence of multiple pathologies. A patient may present with a metabolic acidosis process alone, but they may also have a concomitant respiratory acidosis. Winters's formula gives an expected value for the patient's P_{CO_{2}}; the patient's actual (measured) P_{CO_{2}} is then compared to this. Using this information, physicians may elucidate additional causes of the acid-base derangement and identify different treatment options which may not have otherwise been considered.

If the two values correspond, respiratory compensation is considered to be adequate.

If the measured P_{CO_{2}} is higher than the calculated value, there is also a primary respiratory acidosis.

If the measured P_{CO_{2}} is lower than the calculated value, there is also a primary respiratory alkalosis.
