= Hypercapnia =

Abnormally high tissue carbon dioxide levels

- Other names: Hypercarbia, CO_{2} retention, carbon dioxide poisoning
- Main symptoms of carbon dioxide toxicity, by increasing volume percent in air.
- Specialty: Pulmonology, critical care medicine

Hypercapnia (from the Greek hyper, "above" or "too much" and kapnos, "smoke"), also known as hypercarbia and CO_{2} retention, is a condition of abnormally elevated carbon dioxide (CO_{2}) levels in the blood. Carbon dioxide is a gaseous product of the body's metabolism and is normally expelled through the lungs.

Carbon dioxide may accumulate in any condition that causes hypoventilation, a reduction of alveolar ventilation (the clearance of air from the small sacs of the lung where gas exchange takes place) as well as resulting from inhalation of CO_{2}. Inability of the lungs to clear carbon dioxide, or inhalation of elevated levels of CO_{2}, leads to respiratory acidosis. Eventually the body compensates for the raised acidity by retaining alkali in the kidneys, a process known as "metabolic compensation".

Acute hypercapnia is called acute hypercapnic respiratory failure (AHRF) and is a medical emergency as it generally occurs in the context of acute illness. Chronic hypercapnia, where metabolic compensation is usually present, may cause symptoms but is not generally an emergency. Depending on the scenario both forms of hypercapnia may be treated with medication, with mask-based non-invasive ventilation or with mechanical ventilation.

Hypercapnia is a hazard of underwater diving associated with breath-hold diving, scuba diving, particularly on rebreathers, and deep diving where it is associated with high work of breathing caused by increased breathing gas density due to the high ambient pressure.

== Signs and symptoms ==
Hypercapnia may happen in the context of an underlying health condition, and symptoms may relate to this condition or directly to the hypercapnia. Specific symptoms attributable to early hypercapnia are dyspnea (breathlessness), headache, confusion and lethargy. Clinical signs include flushed skin, full pulse (bounding pulse), rapid breathing, premature heart beats, muscle twitches, and hand flaps (asterixis). The risk of dangerous irregularities of the heart beat is increased. Hypercapnia also occurs when the breathing gas is contaminated with carbon dioxide, or respiratory gas exchange cannot keep up with the metabolic production of carbon dioxide, which can occur when gas density limits ventilation at high ambient pressures.

In severe hypercapnia (generally ${P_{a_{CO_2}}}$ greater than 10 kPa or 75 mmHg), symptomatology progresses to disorientation, panic, hyperventilation, convulsions, unconsciousness, and eventually death.

== Causes ==
Carbon dioxide is a normal metabolic product but it accumulates in the body if it is produced faster than it is cleared. During strenuous exercise the production rate of carbon dioxide can increase more than tenfold over the production rate during rest. Carbon dioxide is dissolved in the blood and elimination is by gas exchange in the lungs during breathing. Hypercapnia is generally caused by hypoventilation, lung disease, or diminished consciousness. It may also be caused by exposure to environments containing abnormally high concentrations of carbon dioxide, such as from volcanic or geothermal activity, or by rebreathing exhaled carbon dioxide. In this situation the hypercapnia can also be accompanied by respiratory acidosis.

Acute hypercapnic respiratory failure may occur in acute illness caused by chronic obstructive pulmonary disease (COPD), chest wall deformity, some forms of neuromuscular disease (such as myasthenia gravis), and obesity hypoventilation syndrome. AHRF may also develop in any form of respiratory failure where the breathing muscles become exhausted, such as severe pneumonia and acute severe asthma. It can also be a consequence of profound suppression of consciousness such as opioid overdose.

=== During diving ===
Normal respiration in divers results in alveolar hypoventilation resulting in inadequate CO_{2} elimination or hypercapnia. Lanphier's work at the US Navy Experimental Diving Unit answered the question, "Why don't divers breathe enough?":

- Higher inspired oxygen (${P_{i_{O_2}}}$) at 4 atm (400 kPa) accounted for not more than 25% of the elevation in end tidal CO_{2} (ET_{CO_{2}}) above values found at the same work rate when breathing air just below the surface.
- Increased work of breathing accounted for most of the elevation of ${P_{a_{CO_2}}}$ (alveolar gas equation) in exposures above 1 atm (100 kPa), as indicated by the results when helium was substituted for nitrogen at 4 atm (400 kPa).
- Inadequate ventilatory response to exertion was indicated by the fact that, despite resting values in the normal range, ${P_{et_{CO_2}}}$ rose markedly with exertion even when the divers breathed air at a depth of only a few feet.

A variety of reasons exist for carbon dioxide not being expelled completely when the diver exhales:

- The diver is exhaling into an enclosed space that does not allow all the CO_{2} to escape to the environment, such as a long snorkel, full-face diving mask, or diving helmet, and the diver then re-inhales from that dead space.
- The carbon dioxide scrubber in the diver's rebreather is failing to remove sufficient carbon dioxide from the loop (higher inspired CO_{2}), the breathing gas is contaminated with CO_{2}, or the non-return valves in the breathing circuit are malfunctioning.
- The diver is overexercising, producing excess carbon dioxide due to elevated metabolic activity and respiratory gas exchange cannot keep up with the metabolic production of carbon dioxide.
- Gas density limits ventilation at high ambient pressures. The density of the breathing gas is higher at depth, so the effort required to fully inhale and exhale increases, making breathing more difficult and less efficient (high work of breathing). Higher gas density also causes gas mixing within the lung to be less efficient, thus increasing the effective dead space.
- The diver is deliberately hypoventilating, known as "skip breathing".

==== Skip breathing ====
Skip breathing is a controversial technique to conserve breathing gas when using open-circuit scuba, which consists of briefly holding one's breath between inhalation and exhalation (i.e., "skipping" a breath). It can lead to CO_{2} not being exhaled efficiently. The risk of burst lung (pulmonary barotrauma of ascent) is increased if the breath is held while ascending. It is particularly counterproductive with a rebreather, where the act of breathing pumps the gas around the "loop", pushing carbon dioxide through the scrubber and mixing freshly injected oxygen.

In closed-circuit rebreather diving, exhaled carbon dioxide must be removed from the breathing system, usually by a scrubber containing a solid chemical compound with a high affinity for CO_{2}, such as soda lime. If not removed from the system, it may be reinhaled, causing an increase in the inhaled concentration.

Under hyperbaric conditions, hypercapnia contributes to nitrogen narcosis and oxygen toxicity by causing cerebral vasodilation which increases the dosage of oxygen to the brain.

== Mechanism ==
Hypercapnia normally triggers a reflex which increases breathing and access to oxygen (O_{2}), such as arousal and turning the head during sleep. A failure of this reflex can be fatal, for example as a contributory factor in sudden infant death syndrome.

Hypercapnia can induce increased cardiac output, an elevation in arterial blood pressure (higher levels of carbon dioxide stimulate aortic and carotid chemoreceptors with afferents -CN IX and X- to medulla oblongata with following chrono- and ino-tropic effects), and a propensity toward cardiac arrhythmias. Hypercapnia may increase pulmonary capillary resistance.

== Physiological effects ==
A high arterial partial pressure of carbon dioxide (${P_{a_{CO_2}}}$) causes changes in brain activity that adversely affect both fine muscular control and reasoning. EEG changes denoting minor narcotic effects can be detected for expired gas end tidal partial pressure of carbon dioxide (${P_{ET_{CO_2}}}$) increase from 40 torrs (0.053 atm) to approximately 50 torrs (0.066 atm). The diver does not necessarily notice these effects.

Higher levels of ${P_{a_{CO_2}}}$ have a stronger narcotic effect: Confusion and irrational behaviour may occur around 72 torrs (0.095 atm), and loss of consciousness around 90 torrs (0.12 atm). High ${P_{a_{CO_2}}}$triggers the fight or flight response, affects hormone levels and can cause anxiety, irritability and inappropriate or panic responses, which can be beyond the control of the subject, sometimes with little or no warning. Vasodilation is another effect, notably in the skin, where feelings of unpleasant heat are reported, and in the brain, where blood flow can increase by 50% at a ${P_{ET_{CO_2}}}$ of 50 torrs (0.066 atm), Intracranial pressure may rise, with a throbbing headache. If associated with a high ${P_{a_{CO_2}}}$ the high delivery of oxygen to the brain may increase the risk of CNS oxygen toxicity at partial pressures usually considered acceptable.

In many people a high ${P_{a_{CO_2}}}$ causes a feeling of shortness of breath, but the lack of this symptom is no guarantee that the other effects are not occurring. A significant percentage of rebreather deaths have been associated with CO_{2} retention. The effects of high ${P_{a_{CO_2}}}$ can take several minutes to hours to resolve once the cause has been removed.

== Diagnosis ==
Blood gas tests may be performed, typically by radial artery puncture, in the setting of acute breathing problems or other acute medical illness. Hypercapnia is generally defined as an arterial blood carbon dioxide level over 45 mmHg (6 kPa). Since carbon dioxide is in equilibrium with carbonic acid in the blood, hypercapnia drives serum pH down, resulting in respiratory acidosis. Clinically, the effect of hypercapnia on pH is estimated using the ratio of the arterial pressure of carbon dioxide to the concentration of bicarbonate ion, ${P_{a_{CO_2/HCO_3^-}}}$.

=== Tolerance ===
Tolerance to increased atmospheric CO_{2} concentration
| %CO_{2} in inspired air | Expected tolerance for useful activity on continued exposure to elevated CO_{2} | |
| %CO_{2} in inspired air | Duration | Major limitation |
|---|---|---|
| 0.03 | lifetime | atmosphere, year 1780 |
| 0.04 | lifetime | current atmosphere |
| 0.5 | lifetime | no detectable limitations (Note: refer to modern research in Carbon dioxide#Below 1% which shows measurable effects below 1%.) |
| 1.0 | lifetime | no detectable limitations (Note: refer to modern research in Carbon dioxide#Below 1% which shows measurable effects below 1%.) |
| 1.5 | > 1 month | mild respiratory stimulation |
| 2.0 | > 1 month | mild respiratory stimulation |
| 2.5 | > 1 month | mild respiratory stimulation |
| 3.0 | > 1 month | moderate respiratory stimulation |
| 3.5 | > 1 week | moderate respiratory stimulation |
| 4.0 | > 1 week | moderate respiratory stimulation, exaggerated respiratory response to exercise |
| 4.5 | > 8 hours | moderate respiratory stimulation, exaggerated respiratory response to exercise |
| 5.0 | > 4 hours | prominent respiratory stimulus, exaggerated respiratory response to exercise |
| 5.5 | > 1 hours | prominent respiratory stimulus, exaggerated respiratory response to exercise |
| 6.0 | > 0.5 hours | prominent respiratory stimulus, exaggerated respiratory response to exercise, beginnings of mental confusion |
| 6.5 | > 0.25 hours | prominent respiratory stimulus, exaggerated respiratory response to exercise, beginnings of mental confusion |
| 7.0 | > 0.1 hours | limitation by dyspnea and mental confusion |

=== CO_{2} toxicity in animal models ===
Tests performed on mongrel dogs showed the physiological effect of carbon dioxide on the body of the animal: after inhalation of a 50% CO_{2} and 50% air mixture, respiratory movement increased for about 2 minutes, and then, it decreased for 30 to 90 minutes. Hill and Flack showed that CO_{2} concentrations up to 35% have an exciting effect upon both circulation and respiration, but those beyond 35% are depressant upon them. The blood pressure (BP) decreased transiently during the increased respiratory movement and then rose again and maintained the original level for a while. The heart rate slowed slightly just after the gas mixture inhalation. It is believed that the initial BP depression with the decreased heart rate is due to the direct depressant effect of CO_{2} upon the heart and that the return of blood pressure to its original level was due to the rapid rise of ${P_{a_{CO_2}}}$. After 30–90 min, the respiratory center was depressed, and hypotension occurred gradually or suddenly from reduced cardiac output, leading to an apnea and eventually to circulatory arrest.

At higher concentrations of CO_{2}, unconsciousness occurred almost instantaneously and respiratory movement ceased in 1 minute. After a few minutes of apnea, circulatory arrest was seen. These findings imply that the cause of death in breathing high concentrations of CO_{2} is not the hypoxia but the intoxication of carbon dioxide.

== Treatment ==
The treatment for acute hypercapnic respiratory failure depends on the underlying cause, but may include medications and mechanical respiratory support. In those without contraindications, non-invasive ventilation (NIV) is often used in preference to invasive mechanical ventilation. In the past, the drug doxapram (a respiratory stimulant), was used for hypercapnia in acute exacerbation of chronic obstructive pulmonary disease but there is little evidence to support its use compared to NIV, and it does not feature in recent professional guidelines.

Very severe respiratory failure, in which hypercapnia may also be present, is often treated with extracorporeal membrane oxygenation (ECMO), in which oxygen is added to and carbon dioxide removed directly from the blood.

A relatively novel modality is extracorporeal carbon dioxide removal (ECCO_{2}R). This technique removes CO_{2} from the bloodstream and may reduce the time mechanical ventilation is required for those with AHRF; it requires smaller volumes of blood flow compared to ECMO.

== Terminology ==
Hypercapnia is the opposite of hypocapnia, the state of having abnormally reduced levels of carbon dioxide in the blood.

== See also ==
- Dead space (physiology) – Inhaled air volume not involved in gas exchange
- Hypocapnia – State of reduced carbon dioxide in the blood
- Inert gas asphyxiation – Insufficient oxygen in breathed air
- Lake Nyos – Crater lake in the Northwest Region of Cameroon
- Ocean acidification – Decrease of pH levels in the ocean
- Permissive hypercapnia – Hypercapnia in respiratory insufficiency
- Waterboarding – Torture method simulating drowning
