= Metabolic alkalosis =

Abnormally high tissue pH due to metabolic dysfunction

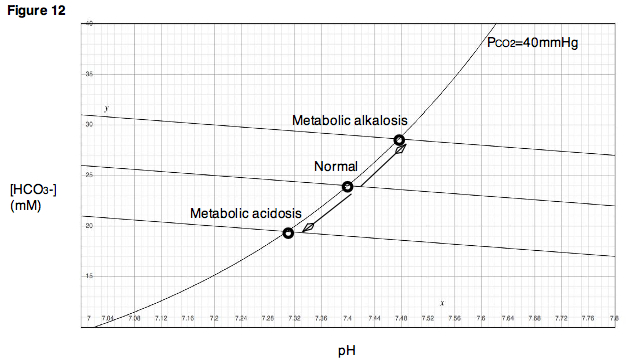
- Davenport diagram
- Specialty: Endocrinology, nephrology

Metabolic alkalosis is an acid-base disorder in which the pH of tissue is elevated beyond the normal range (7.35–7.45). This is the result of decreased hydrogen ion concentration, leading to increased bicarbonate (HCO_{3}^{−}), or alternatively a direct result of increased bicarbonate concentrations. The condition typically cannot last long if the kidneys are functioning properly.

== Signs and symptoms ==
Severe metabolic alkalosis impacts multiple body systems, including the brain, muscles, heart, and lungs, and can cause various metabolic imbalances.

Clinical manifestations of metabolic alkalosis
Organ system	Symptom
Central nervous system	Reduction in blood flow
Central nervous system	Confusion
Central nervous system	Obtundation
Central nervous system	Reduced seizure threshold
Neuromuscular	Increased excitability
Neuromuscular	Tetany
Cardiovascular	Reduced cardiac output
Cardiovascular	Reduced coronary blood flow
Cardiovascular	Arteriolar vasoconstriction
Cardiovascular	Increased heart rate
Cardiovascular	Predisposition to refractory ventricular and supraventricular arrhythmias
Pulmonary	Hypoventilation
Pulmonary	Hypercapnia
Pulmonary	Hypoxia
Metabolic	Hypokalemia
Metabolic	Decreased ionized Ca^{2+}
Metabolic	Hypophosphatemia
Metabolic	Hypomagnesemia
Metabolic	Stimulation of glycolysis and production of lactate

== Causes ==
Causes of metabolic alkalosis
Chloride-responsive alkalosis		Chloride-resistant alkalosis	
GI and kidney-associated	Vomiting	Hypertension-associated	Primary aldosteronism
GI and kidney-associated	Nasogastric suction	Hypertension-associated	11β-hydroxysteroid dehydrogenase type 2 deficiency
GI and kidney-associated	Congenital chloride diarrhea	Hypertension-associated	Liquorice
GI and kidney-associated	Villous adenoma	Hypertension-associated	Chewing tobacco
GI and kidney-associated	Posthypercapnia	Hypertension-associated	Carbenoxolone
GI and kidney-associated	Cl^{−}-depletion alkalosis	Hypertension-associated	Fludrocortisone administration
GI and kidney-associated	Cystic fibrosis	Hypertension-associated	Cushing syndrome
GI and kidney-associated	Severe K^{+} deficiency	Hypertension-associated	Ectopic corticotropin
GI and kidney-associated	Milk-alkali syndrome	Hypertension-associated	Glucocorticoid-remediable aldosteronism
GI and kidney-associated	Gastrocystoplasty	Hypertension-associated	Hyperreninism and hyperaldosteronism (hypertensive emergency and renovascular hypertension, renin-secreting tumors)
GI and kidney-associated	Zollinger–Ellison syndrome	Hypertension-associated	Hyperreninism and hyperaldosteronism (hypertensive emergency and renovascular hypertension, renin-secreting tumors)
Drug-associated	Diuretics	Hypertension-associated	Liddle's syndrome
Drug-associated	Poorly reabsorbable anions (carbenicillin, penicillin, phosphate, sulfate)	Normotension-associated	Bartter syndrome
Drug-associated	NaHCO3 (baking soda)	Normotension-associated	Gitelman syndrome
Drug-associated	Sodium citrate, lactate, gluconate, acetate	Others	Hypercalcemia
Drug-associated	Antacids	Others	Hypoparathyroidism
Drug-associated	Transfusions	Others	Post-feeding alkalosis

The causes of metabolic alkalosis can be divided into two categories, depending upon urine chloride levels.

=== Chloride-responsive (Urine chloride < 25 mEq/L) ===
- Loss of hydrogen ions – Most often occurs via two mechanisms, either vomiting or via the kidney.
  - Vomiting results in the loss of hydrochloric acid (hydrogen and chloride ions) with the stomach contents. In the hospital setting this can commonly occur from nasogastric suction tubes.
  - Severe vomiting also causes loss of potassium (hypokalemia) and sodium (hyponatremia). The kidneys compensate for these losses by retaining sodium in the collecting ducts at the expense of hydrogen ions (sparing sodium/potassium pumps to prevent further loss of potassium), leading to metabolic alkalosis.
- Congenital chloride diarrhea – rare for being a diarrhea that causes alkalosis instead of acidosis.
- Contraction alkalosis – This results from a loss of water in the extracellular space, such as from dehydration. Decreased extracellular volume triggers the renin-angiotensin-aldosterone system, and aldosterone subsequently stimulates reabsorption of sodium (and thus water) within the nephron of the kidney. However, a second action of aldosterone is to stimulate renal excretion of hydrogen ions (while retaining bicarbonate), and it is this loss of hydrogen ions that raises the pH of the blood.
  - Diuretic therapy – loop diuretics and thiazides can both initially cause increase in chloride, but once stores are depleted, urine excretion will be below < 25 mEq/L. The loss of fluid from sodium excretion causes a contraction alkalosis. Diuretic abuse among athletes and people with eating disorders may present with metabolic alkalosis.
- Posthypercapnia – Hypoventilation (decreased respiratory rate) causes hypercapnia (increased levels of CO_{2}), which results in respiratory acidosis. Renal compensation with excess bicarbonate retention occurs to lessen the effect of the acidosis. Once carbon dioxide levels return to base line, the higher bicarbonate levels reveal themselves putting the patient into metabolic alkalosis.
- Cystic fibrosis – excessive loss of sodium chloride in the sweat leads to contraction of the extracellular volume in the same way as contraction alkalosis, as well chloride depletion.
- Alkalotic agents – Alkalotic agents, such as bicarbonate (administered in cases of peptic ulcer or hyperacidity) or antacids, administered in excess can lead to an alkalosis.

=== Chloride-indeterminate alkalosis ===
- Milk alkali syndrome
- Blood product administration since this contains sodium citrate which is then metabolized into sodium bicarbonate. Typically, this is seen with large volume transfusions such as more than 8 units.
- Decreases in albumin and phosphate will cause metabolic alkalosis.

=== Chloride-resistant (Urine chloride > 20 mEq/L) ===
- Retention of bicarbonate – Retention of bicarbonate would lead to alkalosis.
- Shift of hydrogen ions into intracellular space – Seen in hypokalemia. Due to a low extracellular potassium concentration, potassium shifts out of the cells. In order to maintain electrical neutrality, hydrogen shifts into the cells, raising blood pH.
- Hyperaldosteronism – Loss of hydrogen ions in the urine occurs when excess aldosterone (Conn's syndrome) increases the activity of a sodium-hydrogen exchange protein in the kidney. This increases the retention of sodium ions whilst pumping hydrogen ions into the renal tubule. Excess sodium increases extracellular volume and the loss of hydrogen ions creates a metabolic alkalosis. Later, the kidney responds through the aldosterone escape to excrete sodium and chloride in urine.
- Excess glycyrrhizin consumption
- Low levels of magnesium in the blood
- Severely high levels of calcium in the blood
- Bartter syndrome and Gitelman syndrome – syndromes with presentations analogous to taking diuretics characterized with normotensive patients
- Liddle syndrome – a gain of function mutation in the genes encoding the epithelial sodium channel (ENaC) which is characterized by hypertension and hypoaldosteronism.
- 11β-hydroxylase deficiency and 17α-hydroxylase deficiency – both characterized by hypertension
- Aminoglycoside toxicity can induce a hypokalemic metabolic alkalosis via activating the calcium sensing receptor in the thick ascending limb of the nephron, inactivating the NKCC2 cotransporter, creating a Bartter's syndrome like effect.

== Compensation ==
Compensation for metabolic alkalosis occurs mainly in the lungs, which retain carbon dioxide (CO_{2}) through slower breathing, or hypoventilation (respiratory compensation). CO_{2} is then consumed toward the formation of the carbonic acid intermediate, thus decreasing pH. Respiratory compensation, though, is incomplete. The decrease in [H+] suppresses the peripheral chemoreceptors, which are sensitive to pH. But, because respiration slows, there is an increase in pCO_{2} which would cause an offset of the depression because of the action of the central chemoreceptors which are sensitive to the partial pressure of CO_{2} in the cerebral spinal fluid. So, because of the central chemoreceptors, respiration rate would be increased.

Renal compensation for metabolic alkalosis, less effective than respiratory compensation, consists of increased excretion of HCO_{3}^{−} (bicarbonate), as the filtered load of HCO_{3}^{−} exceeds the ability of the renal tubule to reabsorb it.

To calculate the expected pCO_{2} in the setting of metabolic alkalosis, the following equations are used:

- pCO_{2} = 0.7 [HCO_{3}^{−}] + 20 mmHg ± 5
- pCO_{2} = 0.7 [HCO_{3}^{−}] + 21 mmHg

== Diagnosis ==
=== Classification ===
Metabolic alkalosis can be divided into two different types; chloride responsive alkalosis and chloride resistant alkalosis.

== Treatment ==
To effectively treat metabolic alkalosis, the underlying cause(s) must be corrected. A trial of intravenous chloride-rich fluid is warranted if there is a high index of suspicion for chloride-responsive metabolic alkalosis caused by loss of gastrointestinal fluid (e.g., due to vomiting).

== Terminology ==
- Alkalosis refers to a process by which the pH is increased.
- Alkalemia refers to a pH which is higher than normal, specifically in the blood.

== See also ==
- Hypokalemia
- Metabolic acidosis
- Respiratory acidosis
- Respiratory alkalosis

== Works cited ==
- Reddi, Alluru S. (2023). "Metabolic Alkalosis". Fluid, Electrolyte and Acid-Base Disorders. Cham: Springer International Publishing. doi:10.1007/978-3-031-25810-7_37. ISBN 978-3-031-25809-1.
