= Fetal scalp stimulation test =

Diagnostic test used to detect fetal metabolic acidemia

- Purpose: detect fetal metabolic acidemia

Fetal scalp stimulation test is a diagnostic test used to detect fetal metabolic acidemia. It can be used as a non-invasive alternative to fetal scalp blood testing.

== Procedure ==
A firm digital pressure on head or a gentle pinch of fetal head with atraumatic clamp is used for stimulation. An acceleration of the fetal heart rate of 15 bpm lasting at least 15 seconds is suggestive of normal fetal outcome.

== See also ==
- Fetal scalp blood testing
