= Respiratory compensation =

Change in breathing to restore blood pH

- Bicarbonate molecule
- Specialty: Pulmonology

Respiratory compensation is the modulation by the brainstem respiratory centers, which involves altering alveolar ventilation to try to bring the plasma pH back to its normal value (7.4) in order to keep the acid-base balance in the body. It usually occurs within minutes to hours and is much faster than renal compensation (takes several days), but has less ability to restore normal values.

In metabolic acidosis, chemoreceptors sense a changed acid-base balance with a plasma pH of lesser than normal (<7.4). The chemoreceptors send afferent fibers to the brainstem respiratory centers. The brainstem respiratory centers increase alveolar ventilation (hyperventilation) so that carbon dioxide (CO_{2}) can be breathed off, resulting in an increase of plasma pH. The amount of respiratory compensation in metabolic acidosis can be estimated using Winters' formula. Hyperventilation due to the compensation for metabolic acidosis persists for 24 to 48 hours after correction of the acidosis, and can lead to respiratory alkalosis. This compensation process can occur within minutes.

In metabolic alkalosis, chemoreceptors sense a deranged acid-base balance with a plasma pH of greater than normal (>7.4). The chemoreceptors send afferent fibers to the brainstem respiratory centers. The brainstem respiratory centers decrease alveolar ventilation (hypoventilation) to create a rise in arterial carbon dioxide (CO_{2}) tension, resulting in a decrease of plasma pH. However, as there is limitation for decreasing respiration, respiratory compensation is less efficient at compensating for metabolic alkalosis than for acidosis.

The respiratory brainstem centers can only compensate for metabolic acid-base disturbances (metabolic acidosis and metabolic alkalosis). Renal compensation is needed to balance respiratory acid-base syndromes (respiratory acidosis and respiratory alkalosis). The kidneys can compensate for both, respiratory and metabolic acid-base imbalances.
