= XCO2 =

XCO_{2} is the column-averaged of carbon dioxide in the atmosphere, represented in parts per million (ppm). Rather than taking a single observation at the surface, an integration of atmospheric CO_{2} above a specific location is observed. The 'X' refers to the observation taking place from a satellite platform. CO_{2} observing satellites cannot observe green house gasses directly, but instead average the entire atmospheric column of CO_{2}. These estimates from satellites need ground truthing to ensure that XCO_{2} retrievals are accurate, with an average accuracy from OCO 2 and GOSAT of 0.267 ± 1.56 ppm between September 2014 to December 2016.

The largest recorded value XCO_{2} was recorded during May 2018 over the Northern Hemisphere, with a value of approximately 410 ppm. These values have been increasing steadily over recent years. Space-based CO_{2} measurements are used for climate-level scientific studies such as a further understanding of the El Niño–Southern Oscillation

== See also ==
- pCO_{2}
- Carbon dioxide in Earth's atmosphere
- CO_{2} observing satellite
- Orbiting Carbon Observatory 2
