= Blood lancet =

Small medical instrument used for blood sampling

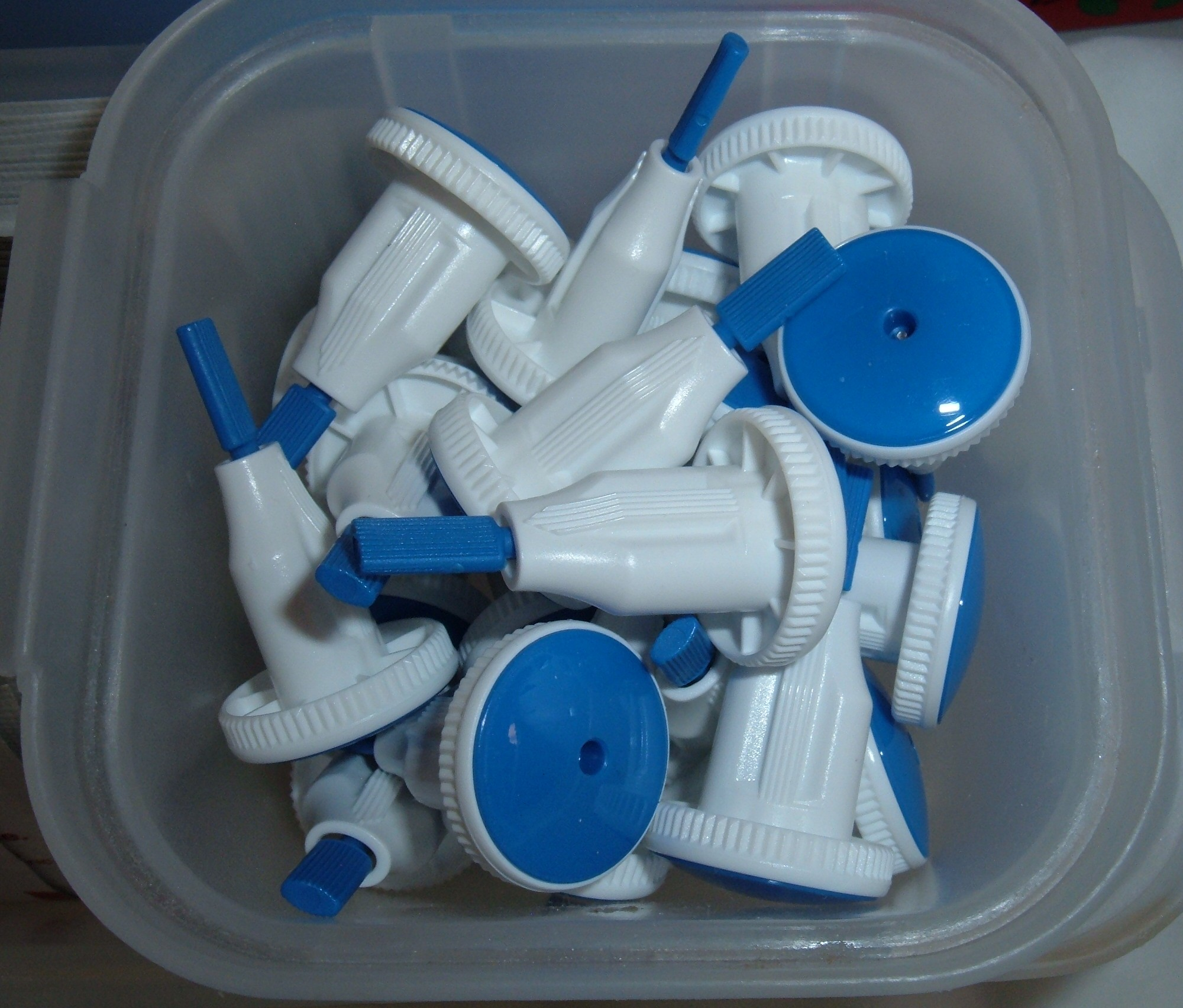
Box of disposable lancets.

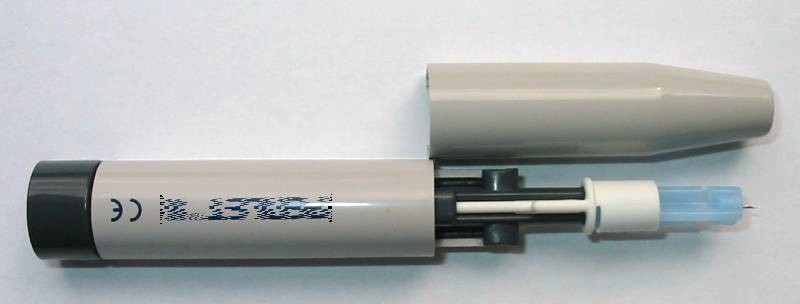
Blood-sampling device with a lancet at the tip.

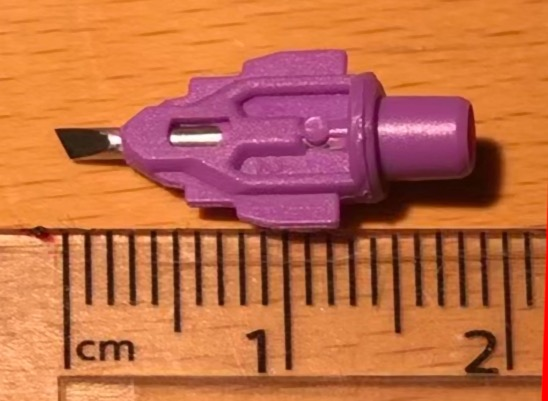
Blade extracted from disposable self retracting blood lancet with ruler for scale.

A blood lancet, or simply lancet, is a small medical implement used for capillary blood sampling. A blood lancet, sometimes called a lance, is similar to a scalpel style lancet, but with a double-edged blade and a pointed end. It can even be a specialized type of sharp needle.

== Use ==
Lancets are used to make punctures, such as a fingerstick, to obtain small blood specimens. Blood lancets are generally disposable.

Lancets are also used to prick the skin in dermatological testing for allergies.

== Lancing device ==
A blood-sampling device, also known as a lancing device, is an instrument equipped with a lancet. It is also most commonly used by diabetic patients during blood glucose monitoring. The depth of skin penetration can be adjusted for various skin thicknesses. Long lancing devices are used for fetal scalp blood testing to get a measure of the acid base status of the fetus.

== Blood sampling ==
The small capillary blood samples obtained can be tested for blood glucose, hemoglobin, and many other blood components.
