= Metabolic acidosis =

Imbalance in the body's acid-base equilibrium

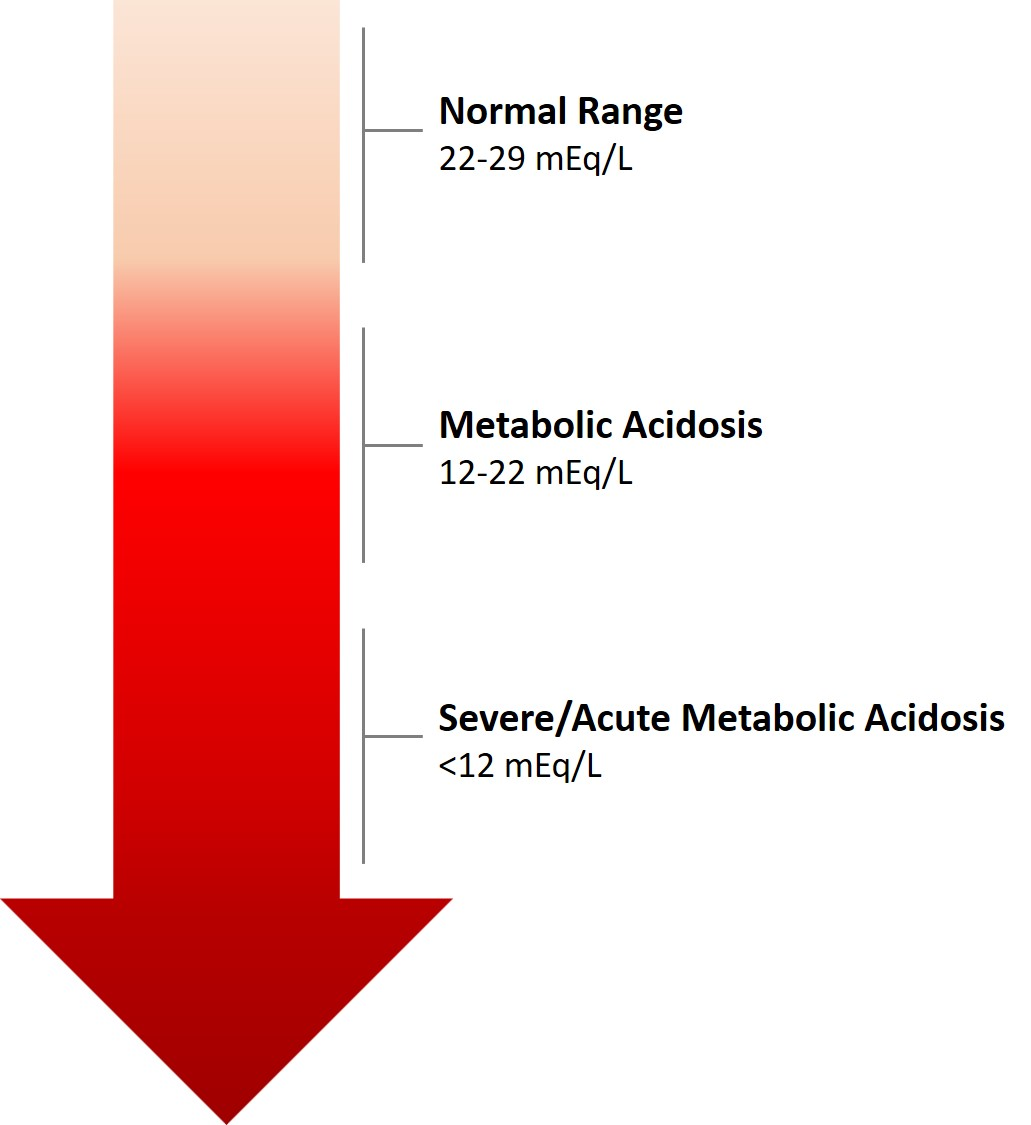
- The calculated level of bicarbonate in the blood (HCO_{3}^{−}) reflects the severity of acidosis.
- Specialty: Nephrology
- Complications: Acute: poor morbidity and mortality outcomes; Chronic: adverse outcomes on kidney function, musculoskeletal system, possible cardiovascular effects
- Types: Acute Metabolic Acidosis; Chronic Metabolic Acidosis
- Causes: Acute: Excessive amounts of organic acids; Chronic: Impaired kidney function
- Diagnostic method: Level of bicarbonate (HCO3-) in the blood
- Treatment: Acute: Mitigation of the underlying cause for the metabolic problem, such as administration of insulin in cases of diabetic ketoacidosis or restoration of effective circulating intravascular volume in cases of lactic acidosis. The administration of IV bicarbonate, although intellectually appealing, is rarely indicated or administered Chronic: Diet rich in fruits and vegetables, oral alkali therapy
- Frequency: Acute: Most often presented during critical illnesses, and hospitalizations: incidence ranging 14–42%. Chronic: Highly prevalent in people with Chronic Kidney Disease: 9.4% CKD Stage 3a; 18.1% CKD Stage 3b; 31.5% CKD Stage 4 and 5

Metabolic acidosis is a serious electrolyte disorder characterized by an imbalance in the body's acid-base balance. Metabolic acidosis has three main root causes: increased acid production, loss of bicarbonate, and a reduced ability of the kidneys to excrete excess acids. Metabolic acidosis can lead to acidemia, which is defined as arterial blood pH that is lower than 7.35. Acidemia and acidosis are not mutually exclusive – pH and hydrogen ion concentrations also depend on the coexistence of other acid-base disorders; therefore, pH levels in people with metabolic acidosis can range from low to high.

Acute metabolic acidosis, lasting from minutes to several days, often occurs during serious illnesses or hospitalizations, and is generally caused when the body produces an excess amount of organic acids (ketoacids in ketoacidosis, or lactic acid in lactic acidosis). A state of chronic metabolic acidosis, lasting several weeks to years, can be the result of impaired kidney function (chronic kidney disease) and/or bicarbonate wasting. The adverse effects of acute versus chronic metabolic acidosis also differ, with acute metabolic acidosis impacting the cardiovascular system in hospital settings, and chronic metabolic acidosis affecting muscles, bones, kidney and cardiovascular health.

== Signs and symptoms ==
=== Acute metabolic acidosis ===
Symptoms are not specific, and diagnosis can be difficult unless patients present with clear indications for blood gas sampling. Symptoms may include palpitations, headache, altered mental status such as severe anxiety due to hypoxia, decreased visual acuity, nausea, vomiting, abdominal pain, altered appetite and weight gain, muscle weakness, bone pain, and joint pain. People with acute metabolic acidosis may exhibit deep, rapid breathing called Kussmaul respirations which is classically associated with diabetic ketoacidosis. Rapid deep breaths increase the amount of carbon dioxide exhaled, thus lowering the serum carbon dioxide levels, resulting in some degree of compensation. Overcompensation via respiratory alkalosis to form an alkalemia does not occur.

Extreme acidemia can also lead to neurological and cardiac complications:

- Neurological: lethargy, stupor, coma, seizures
- Cardiac: Abnormal heart rhythms (e.g., ventricular tachycardia) and decreased response to epinephrine, both leading to low blood pressure

Physical examination can occasionally reveal signs of the disease, but is often otherwise normal. Cranial nerve abnormalities are reported in ethylene glycol poisoning, and retinal edema can be a sign of methanol intoxication.

=== Chronic metabolic acidosis ===
Chronic metabolic acidosis has non-specific clinical symptoms but can be readily diagnosed by testing serum bicarbonate levels in patients with chronic kidney disease (CKD) as part of a comprehensive metabolic panel. Patients with CKD Stages G3–G5 should be routinely screened for metabolic acidosis.

== Diagnostic approach and causes ==
Metabolic acidosis results in a reduced serum pH that is due to metabolic and not respiratory dysfunction. Typically the serum bicarbonate concentration will be <22 mEq/L, below the normal range of 22 to 29 mEq/L, the standard base will be more negative than -2 (base deficit) and the pCO_{2} will be reduced as a result of hyperventilation in an attempt to restore the pH closer to normal. Occasionally in a mixed acid-base disorder where metabolic acidosis is not the primary disorder present, the pH may be normal or high. In the absence of chronic respiratory alkalosis, metabolic acidosis can be clinically diagnosed by analysis of the calculated serum bicarbonate level.

=== Causes ===
Generally, metabolic acidosis occurs when the body produces too much acid (e.g., lactic acidosis, see below section), there is a loss of bicarbonate from the blood, or when the kidneys are not removing enough acid from the body.

Chronic metabolic acidosis is most often caused by a decreased capacity of the kidneys to excrete excess acids through renal ammoniagenesis. The typical Western diet generates 75–100 mEq of acid daily, and individuals with normal kidney function increase the production of ammonia to get rid of this dietary acid. As kidney function declines, the tubules lose the ability to excrete excess acid, and this results in buffering of acid using serum bicarbonate, as well as bone and muscle stores.

As there are many causes of acute metabolic acidosis it is helpful to group them by the presence or absence of a normal anion gap.

Increased anion gap

Causes of increased anion gap include:

- Lactic acidosis
- Ketoacidosis (e.g., Diabetic, alcoholic, or starvation)
- Chronic kidney failure
- 5-oxoprolinemia due to long-term ingestion of high-doses of acetaminophen with glutathione depletion (often seen with sepsis, liver failure, kidney failure, or malnutrition)
- Intoxication:
  - Salicylates, methanol, ethylene glycol
  - Organic acids, paraldehyde, ethanol, formaldehyde
  - Carbon monoxide, cyanide, ibuprofen, metformin
- Propylene glycol (metabolized to L and D-lactate and is often found in infusions for certain intravenous medications used in the intensive care unit)
- Massive rhabdomyolysis
- Isoniazid, iron, phenelzine, tranylcypromine, valproic acid, verapamil
- Topiramate
- Sulfates

Normal anion gap

Causes of normal anion gap include:

- Inorganic acid addition
  - Infusion/ingestion of HCl, NH_{4}Cl
- Gastrointestinal base loss
  - Diarrhea
  - Small bowel fistula/drainage
  - Surgical diversion of urine into gut loops
- Renal base loss/acid retention:
  - Proximal renal tubular acidosis
  - Distal renal tubular acidosis
- Hyperalimentation
- Addison disease
- Acetazolamide
- Spironolactone
- Saline infusion

To distinguish between the main types of metabolic acidosis, a clinical tool called the anion gap is very useful. The anion gap is calculated by subtracting the sum of the serum concentrations of major anions, chloride and bicarbonate, from the serum concentration of the major cation, sodium. (The serum potassium concentration may be added to the calculation, but this merely changes the normal reference range for what is considered a normal anion gap)

Because the concentration of serum sodium is greater than the combined concentrations of chloride and bicarbonate an 'anion gap' is noted. In reality serum is electoneutral because of the presence of other minor cations (potassium, calcium and magnesium) and anions (albumin, sulphate and phosphate) that are not measured in the equation that calculates the anion gap.

The normal value for the anion gap is 8–16 mmol/L (12±4). An elevated anion gap (i.e. > 16 mmol/L) indicates the presence of excess 'unmeasured' anions, such as lactic acid in anaerobic metabolism resulting from tissue hypoxia, glycolic and formic acid produced by the metabolism of toxic alcohols, ketoacids produced when acetyl-CoA undergoes ketogenesis rather than entering the tricarboxylic (Krebs) cycle, and failure of renal excretion of products of metabolism such as sulphates and phosphates.

Adjunctive tests are useful in determining the aetiology of a raised anion gap metabolic acidosis including detection of an osmolar gap indicative of the presence of a toxic alcohol, measurement of serum ketones indicative of ketoacidosis and renal function tests and urinanalysis to detect renal dysfunction.

Elevated protein (albumin, globulins) may theoretically increase the anion gap but high levels are not usually encountered clinically. Hypoalbuminaemia, which is frequently encountered clinically, will mask an anion gap. As a rule of thumb, a decrease in serum albumin by 1 g/L will decrease the anion gap by 0.25 mmol/L

== Pathophysiology ==
=== Compensatory mechanisms ===
Metabolic acidosis is characterized by a low concentration of bicarbonate (HCO^{−}_{3}), which can happen with increased generation of acids (such as ketoacids or lactic acid), excess loss of HCO^{−}_{3} by the kidneys or gastrointestinal tract, or an inability to generate sufficient HCO^{−}_{3}. Thus demonstrating the importance of maintaining balance between acids and bases in the body for maintaining optimal functioning of organs, tissues and cells.

The body regulates the acidity of the blood by four buffering mechanisms.

- Bicarbonate buffering system
- Intracellular buffering by absorption of hydrogen atoms by various molecules, including proteins, phosphates and carbonate in bone.
- Respiratory compensation. Hyperventilation will cause more carbon dioxide to be removed from the body and thereby increases pH.
- Kidney compensation

=== Bicarbonate Buffering System ===
The decreased bicarbonate that distinguishes metabolic acidosis is therefore due to two separate processes: the buffer (from water and carbon dioxide) and additional renal generation. The buffer reactions are:
$$\ce{H+ + HCO3- <=> H2CO3 <=> CO2 + H2O}$$

The Henderson–Hasselbalch equation mathematically describes the relationship between blood pH and the components of the bicarbonate buffering system:
$$p\ce{H}=pK_\text{a}+\operatorname{\mathrm{Log}}\frac{\left[\ce{HCO3^-}\right]}{\left[\ce{CO2}\right]}\text{,}$$
where pK_{a} ≈ 6.1. In clinical practice, the CO_{2} concentration is usually determined via Henry's law from P_{aCO_{2}}, the CO_{2} partial pressure in arterial blood:
$$[\ce{CO2}] = (0.03\text{ L}^{-1}/\text{mmHg})\times P_{\text{a}\ce{CO2}}\text{.}$$

For example, blood gas machines usually determine bicarbonate concentrations from measured pH and P_{aCO_{2}} values. Mathematically, the algorithm substitutes the Henry's law formula into the Henderson-Hasselbalch equation and then rearranges:
$$\left[\ce{HCO3^-}\right]=(0.03\text{ L}^{-1}/\text{mmHg})P_{\text{a}\ce{CO2}}\cdot 10^{p\ce{H}-pK_\text{a}}$$
At sea level, normal numbers might be pH ≈ 7.4 and P_{aCO_{2}} ≈ 40 mmHg; these then imply
$$\begin{align}
\left[\ce{HCO3^-}\right]&=(0.03\text{ L}^{-1}/\text{mmHg})(40\text{ mmHg})\cdot10^{7.4-6.1} \\
&=24\text{ L}^{-1}
\end{align}$$

== Consequences ==
=== Acute metabolic acidosis ===
Acute metabolic acidosis most often occurs during hospitalizations, and acute critical illnesses. It is often associated with poor prognosis, with a mortality rate as high as 57% if the pH remains untreated at 7.20. At lower pH levels, acute metabolic acidosis can lead to impaired circulation and end organ function.

=== Chronic metabolic acidosis ===
Chronic metabolic acidosis commonly occurs in people with chronic kidney disease (CKD) with an eGFR of less than 45 ml/min/1.73m^{2}, most often with mild to moderate severity; however, metabolic acidosis can manifest earlier on in the course of CKD. Multiple animal and human studies have shown that metabolic acidosis in CKD, given its chronic nature, has a profound adverse impact on cellular function, overall contributing to high morbidities in patients.

The most adverse consequences of chronic metabolic acidosis in people with CKD, and in particular, for those who have end-stage renal disease (ESRD), are detrimental changes to the bones and muscles. Acid buffering leads to loss of bone density, resulting in an increased risk of bone fractures, renal osteodystrophy, and bone disease; as well, increased protein catabolism leads to muscle wasting. Furthermore, metabolic acidosis in CKD is also associated with a reduction in eGFR; it is both a complication of CKD, as well as an underlying cause of CKD progression.

== Treatment ==
Treatment of metabolic acidosis depends on the underlying cause, and should target reversing the main process. When considering course of treatment, it is important to distinguish between acute versus chronic forms.

=== Acute metabolic acidosis ===
Bicarbonate therapy is generally administered in patients with severe acute acidemia (pH < 7.11), or with less severe acidemia (pH 7.1–7.2) who have severe acute kidney injury. Bicarbonate therapy is not recommended for people with less severe acidosis (pH ≥ 7.1), unless severe acute kidney injury is present. In the BICAR-ICU trial, bicarbonate therapy for maintaining a pH >7.3 had no overall effect on the composite outcome of all-cause mortality and the presence of at least one organ failure at day 7. However, amongst the sub-group of patients with severe acute kidney injury, bicarbonate therapy significantly decreased the primary composite outcome, and 28-day mortality, along with the need for dialysis.

=== Chronic metabolic acidosis ===
For people with chronic kidney disease (CKD), treating metabolic acidosis slows the progression of CKD.

Currently, the most commonly used treatment for chronic metabolic acidosis is oral bicarbonate. The NKF/KDOQI guidelines recommend starting treatment when serum bicarbonate levels are <22 mEq/L, in order to maintain levels ≥ 22 mEq/L. Studies investigating the effects of oral alkali therapy demonstrated improvements in serum bicarbonate levels, resulting in a slower decline in kidney function, and reduction in proteinuria – leading to a reduction in the risk of progressing to kidney failure. However, side effects of oral alkali therapy include gastrointestinal intolerance, worsening edema, and worsening hypertension. Furthermore, large doses of oral alkali are required to treat chronic metabolic acidosis, and the pill burden can limit adherence.

Veverimer (TRC 101) is a promising investigational drug designed to treat metabolic acidosis by binding with the acid in the gastrointestinal tract and removing it from the body through excretion in the feces, in turn decreasing the amount of acid in the body, and increasing the level of bicarbonate in the blood. Results from a Phase 3, double-blind placebo-controlled 12-week clinical trial in people with CKD and metabolic acidosis demonstrated that Veverimer effectively and safely corrected metabolic acidosis in the short-term, and a blinded, placebo-controlled, 40-week extension of the trial assessing long-term safety, demonstrated sustained improvements in physical function and a combined endpoint of death, dialysis, or 50% decline in eGFR.

== See also ==
- Delta ratio
- Metabolic alkalosis
- Pseudohypoxia
- Respiratory acidosis
- Respiratory alkalosis
- Trauma triad of death
- Winters' formula
- Intravenous bicarbonate
