= Fetal head =

Head of a fetus as a measure in obstetrics

The fetal head, and in particular its size, is important from an obstetrical viewpoint because an essential feature of labor is the adaptation between the fetal head and the maternal bony pelvis. Only a comparatively small part of the head at term is represented by the face. The rest of the head is composed of the firm skull, which is made up of two frontal, two parietal, and two temporal bones, along with the upper portion of the occipital bone and the wings of the sphenoid.

These bones are separated by membranous spaces, or sutures. The most important sutures are the frontal, between the two frontal bones; the sagittal, between the two parietal bones; the two coronal, between the frontal and parietal bones; and the two lambdoid, between the posterior margins of the parietal bones and upper margin of the occipital bone. Where several sutures meet, an irregular space forms, which is enclosed by a membrane and designated as a fontanelle. The greater, or anterior, fontanel is a lozenge-shaped space that is situated at the junction of the sagittal and the coronal sutures. The lesser, or posterior, fontanel is represented by a small triangular area at the intersection of the sagittal and lambdoid sutures. The localization of these fontanels gives important information concerning the presentation and position of the fetus. The temporal, fontanelles have no diagnostic

It is customary to measure certain critical diameters and the circumferences of the newborn head. The diameters most frequently used, and the average lengths thereof, are:

1. The occipitofrontal (11.5 cm), which follows a line extending from a point just above the root of the nose to the most prominent portion of the occipital bone.
2. The biparietal (9.5 cm), the greatest transverse diameter of the head, which extends from one parietal boss to the other.
3. The bitemporal (8.0 cm), the greatest distance between the two temporal sutures.
4. The occipitomental (12.5 cm), from the chin to the most prominent portion of the occiput.
5. The suboccipitobregmatic (9.5 cm), which follows a line drawn from the middle of the large fontanel to the undersurface of the occipital bone just where it joins the neck.

The greatest circumference of the head, which corresponds to the plane of the occipitofrontal diameter, averages 34.5 cm (13.6 in), a size too large to fit through the pelvis without flexion. The smallest circumference, corresponding to the plane of the suboccipitobregmatic diameter, is 32 cm (13 in). The bones of the cranium are normally connected only by a thin layer of fibrous tissue that allows considerable shifting or sliding of each bone to accommodate the size and shape of the maternal pelvis. This intrapartum process is termed molding. The head position and degree of skull ossification result in a spectrum of cranial plasticity from minimal to great and, in some cases, undoubtedly contribute to fetopelvic disproportion, a leading indication for cesarean delivery.
