= Fetal scalp blood testing =

- Purpose: assess fetal oxygenation

Fetal scalp blood testing is a technique used in obstetrics during active labor to confirm whether a fetus is receiving enough oxygen. This is a supplementary procedure used to determine if fetal acidemia has occurred following fetal cardiac distress. While continuous fetal heart rate monitoring is the primary method for assessing fetal wellbeing during labor, a change in fetal heart rate is not indicative of fetal acidemia. Some of the signs and symptoms of oxygen deprivation are pH in the umbilical cord, abnormal fetal heartbeat and abnormal coloration of amniotic fluid. This correlation can only be concluded by sampling fetal scalp blood and measuring acid status. Therefore, fetal scalp blood testing could be used to reduce the number of unnecessary emergency caesarean sections made on the decision of fetal heart rate alone.

Fetal blood sampling is a useful procedure that can diagnose, treat, or monitor different fetal problems. With the help of a small needle, various providers and specialists can remove small amounts of blood from the fetus. This procedure is used to help determine blood type, diagnose genetic abnormalities, identify fetal infections, fetal anemia, and low platelet count. With the help of continuous ultrasound guidance to place the needle in the abdomen into the tiny fetal blood vessel, the blood sample gets obtained and sent for testing. Therefore, due to limitation in adding value, fetal scalp testing can serve as second line test to provide and strengthen the information on fetal acidosis and hypoxia status obtained from cardiocotography (CTG). Cardiocotography is the primary means of monitoring a fetus during pregnancy as well as labour.

Fetal blood sampling is a complex procedure and performed when other tests are not possible. It can be done for pregnancies that are 18 weeks or later. The procedure has many benefits such as providing specific information about the baby's health and the ability to treat babies with any severe blood diseases before birth. Potential risks include bleeding from the fetal blood sampling site, infection, changes to heart rate, and death.

== History ==
The use of fetal scalp blood testing originated in Germany in 1961 and required 0.25 mL of blood drawn from the fetus. As one of the first methods of monitoring fetal wellbeing during labor, there were many disadvantages including the need for at least 3 cm dilation of the mother and extreme precision from the physician performing the procedure. Now, fetal scalp blood testing requires a considerable less amount of blood depending if testing pH or lactate.

One safer alternative to fetal scalp blood testing is what is called fetal scalp stimulation. It is a diagnostic test that helps detect metabolic acidemia. Fetal scalp stimulation is a second-line test that helps provide specialists reassurance that the labor process can safely continue. In complicated pregnancies, it is recommended that there is continuous monitoring of the baby's heart rate using an electronic recorder, or CTG. During labor, babies can show abnormal readings on the CTG and, in some cases, this warrants an emergency caesarean section. To avoid this emergency C-section, the baby's scalp is stimulated vaginally to cause an increase in heart rate. This response is indicative that the baby is healthy and receiving enough oxygen and this test also provides a safe alternative as opposed to taking a small blood sample from the baby's scalp and testing the acid-base levels in the blood. This test is beneficial because it reduces the need to have to perform an emergency C-section when it may not be needed.

== Procedure ==
During a fetal scalp blood testing procedure, a small incision on the fetal scalp is made and blood is collected using a capillary tube. An amnioscope with a light source is used to expose the scalp of the fetus, and the procedure requires at least 3 to 4 cm of cervical dilation to visualize the fetal scalp. After blood collection, pH and/or lactate levels are tested requiring up to 25 minutes per sample.

Fetal scalp blood testing is associated with a relatively high failure rate of up to 20% due to variables such as sample contamination with air or amniotic fluid, or inadequate sample volume. Moreover, this process may be invasive, time-consuming, and painful for mother during labour. Rare complications have also been reported including infection, excessive bleeding, and leakage of cerebral spinal fluid. Fetal scalp blood testing should be avoided when there is a potential risk of infection (e.g. HIV, Hepatitis B, Hepatitis C) or any suspicions of rare bleeding disorders in newborns, known as hemophilia.

The procedure is contraindicated in the case of pregnancies less than 34 weeks, abnormal fetal heart rate, abnormal fetal blood status, and maternal infection.

== Fetal Monitoring Parameters ==
Two components that are commonly tested using this method are pH and lactate, both being indicators of acid base homeostasis. A low pH and high level of lactate indicate that there is acidosis, which in turn is associated with hypoxia. The two different types of fetal acidosis are respiratory acidosis or metabolic acidosis. Respiratory acidosis occurs when carbon dioxide accumulates due to decreased placental elimination. This is caused by an increase in pressure on the umbilical cord, but is quickly corrected upon childbirth as carbon dioxide levels return to normal once the baby begins breathing. Metabolic acidosis is caused by anaerobic cell metabolism due to hypoxia. Anaerobic metabolism results in the production of lactate, which breaks down and lowers blood pH. Even after correction, metabolic acidosis can persist for several hours before correction after childbirth.

Uterine contractions during labor and delivery decrease placental blood flow, therefore the fetus is at an increased risk of hypoxia. This is considered as one of the causes of acute fetal hypoxia among the likes of umbilical cord compression and myometrial contractures.

Changes in fetal blood acidity can result in a shift in blood flow away from critical organs, particularly the brain. Conditions which have been reported in newborns who suffered fetal acidemia include hypoxic-ischemic encephalopathy and periventricular leukomalacia.

Scalp pH and lactate testing appear to have similar sensitivity in predicting umbilical artery acidemia. Analysis of pH requires a relatively large amount of blood (30–50 μl), and sampling failure rates of 11–20% have been reported. Analysis of lactate only requires 5 μl of blood and can more accurately identify the cause of acidosis if metabolically induced. Based on clinical literature, there has been discordance between scalp pH and lactate measurements, especially when the cervix was fully dilated. Using lactate values rather than pH or both could result in an increase in obstetric interventions without decreasing severe acidosis. Fetal scalp lactate measurements also require a much smaller volume of blood whereas fetal blood sampling is more invasive. A smaller volume of blood is required for testing of fetal blood sampling for lactate estimation. This test can help determine an abnormal fetal heart rate pattern. Also, this test requires a smaller volume of blood compared to a pH estimation.

Reference ranges
	pH	Lactate
Normal	≥ 7.25	≤ 4.1 mmol/L
Pre-acidemia	7.21–7.24	4.2–4.8 mmol/L
Acidemia	≤ 7.20	≥ 4.9 mmol/L

During pregnancy, placental gas-exchange is primarily responsible for fetus well-being. Placental dysfunction can results in fetal risks such as acidosis, hypoxia, and stillbirth. The normal arterial pH of the fetus is approximately 7.35 before labor. Furthermore, there is a declined in pH which has shown that the mean umbilical arterial pH at birth predicts a pH > 7.25. An abnormal decreases in pH, on the other hand, is shown that there may be a potential risk of acidosis in fetus if the pH is below a threshold of 7.21.

Fetal scalp blood testing for lactate became well-known in the 1990s. One study has shown that there is a correlation between both umbilical cord pH and lactate measurement in fetus arterial blood. From a physiological standpoint, lactate levels in tissues earlier increase before pH decreases in oxygenation deficiency. The advantages of lactate measurement is that it is required 5 μl of fetal blood for analysis and provided immediate results compared to pH scalp testing. One of the observational studies suggested that a threshold of 4.8 mmol/L of lactate scalp measurement was chosen to prevent acidemia in newborns, which is corresponding to fetal scalp pH of 7.21.

Using scalp lactate measurements compared to pH helps provide an easier and more affordable method than continuous electronic fetal monitoring. Nevertheless, literature has shown that both methods has no significant difference in measuring oxygen deprivation as well as in fetal outcome after delivery.

== Advancements ==
Improvements to the fetal blood scalp test procedure have been attempted to decrease invasiveness. Researchers have created a portable oximeter device which attaches to the hand of a physician and allows for the measurement of fetal oxygenation status. This method does not require blood draw from the scalp of the fetus, but instead acts as an indirect measurement of fetal blood pH status by measuring oxygen saturation. Furthermore, studies are being done to evaluate and compare between the fetal scalp blood test and digital fetal scalp blood test, an alternative to fetal scalp blood test that is less invasive, as a second-line test for fetal hypoxia and acid-base status.

== See also ==
- Fetal scalp stimulation test
