= Sampling (medicine) =

Collection of bodily substances for medical assessment

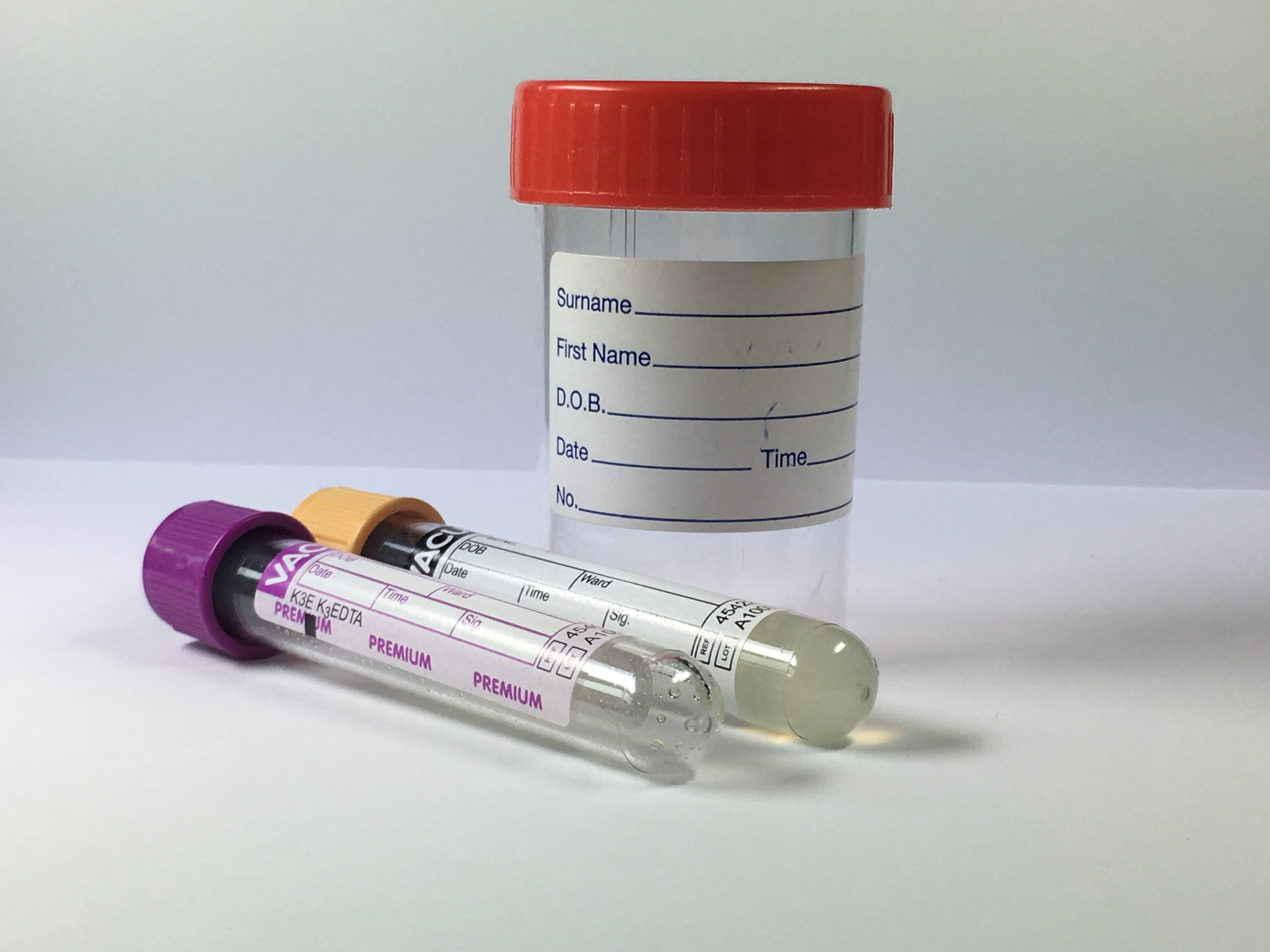
Medical equipment used to collect samples from patients

In medicine, sampling is gathering of matter from the body to aid in the process of a medical diagnosis and/or evaluation of an indication for treatment, further medical tests or other procedures. In this sense, the sample is the gathered matter, and the sampling tool or sampler is the person or material to collect the sample.

Sampling is a prerequisite for many medical tests, but generally not for medical history, physical examination and radiologic tests.

== By sampling technique ==
- Obtaining excretions or materials that leave the body anyway, such as urine, stool, sputum, or vomitus, by direct collection as they exit. A sample of saliva can also be collected from the mouth.
- Excision (cutting out), a surgical method for the removal of solid or soft tissue samples.
- Puncture (also called centesis) followed by aspiration is the main method used for sampling of many types of tissues and body fluids. Examples are thoracocentesis to sample pleural fluid, and amniocentesis to sample amniotic fluid. The main method of centesis, in turn, is fine needle aspiration, but there are also somewhat differently designed needles, such as for bone marrow aspiration. Puncture without aspiration may suffice in, for example, capillary blood sampling.
- Scraping or swiping. In a Pap test, cells are scraped off a uterine cervix with a special spatula and brush or a special broom device that is inserted through a vagina without having to puncture any tissue. Epithelial cells for DNA testing can be obtained by swiping the inside of a cheek in a mouth with a swab.

=== Biopsy or cytopathology ===
In terms of sampling technique, a biopsy generally refers to a preparation where the normal tissue structure is preserved, availing for examination of both individual cells and their organization for the study of histology, while a sample for cytopathology is prepared primarily for the examination of individual cells, not necessarily preserving the tissue structure. Examples of biopsy procedures are bone marrow biopsy, brain biopsy, skin biopsy and liver biopsy.

== By sampled matter ==
Different types of matter that are sampled can be categorized by solidness versus fluidity, such as:

- Solid tissue, such as in bone marrow biopsy
- Soft tissue, such as in a muscle biopsy
- Body fluids such as blood

=== Body fluid sampling ===
Body fluid sampling includes:

- Blood sampling for any blood test, including:
  - Arterial blood sampling, such as by radial artery puncture. This can be done for arterial blood gas analysis.
  - Capillary blood sampling, generally by using a blood lancet for puncture, followed by sampling by capillary action with a test strip or small pipe. This is common for routine diabetic monitoring for glucose.
  - Venous blood sampling, also called phlebotomy. It is generally done by venipuncture (which can also be used for intravenous therapy). Other than routine diabetic monitoring for glucose, the majority of blood tests are done on samples of venous blood taken by a health professional, including phlebotomists who are specifically trained in venipuncture. Such samples are commonly collected in capped test tubes, often with a small amount of some sort of preservative.
- Cerebrospinal fluid sampling, generally by lumbar puncture
- Pleural fluid sampling, generally by thoracocentesis
- Amniotic fluid sampling, generally by amniocentesis
- Peritoneal fluid sampling, generally by peritoneocentesis (also called laparocentesis). It can be used for cytology to detect spread of gynecologic cancers.

== By component of interest ==
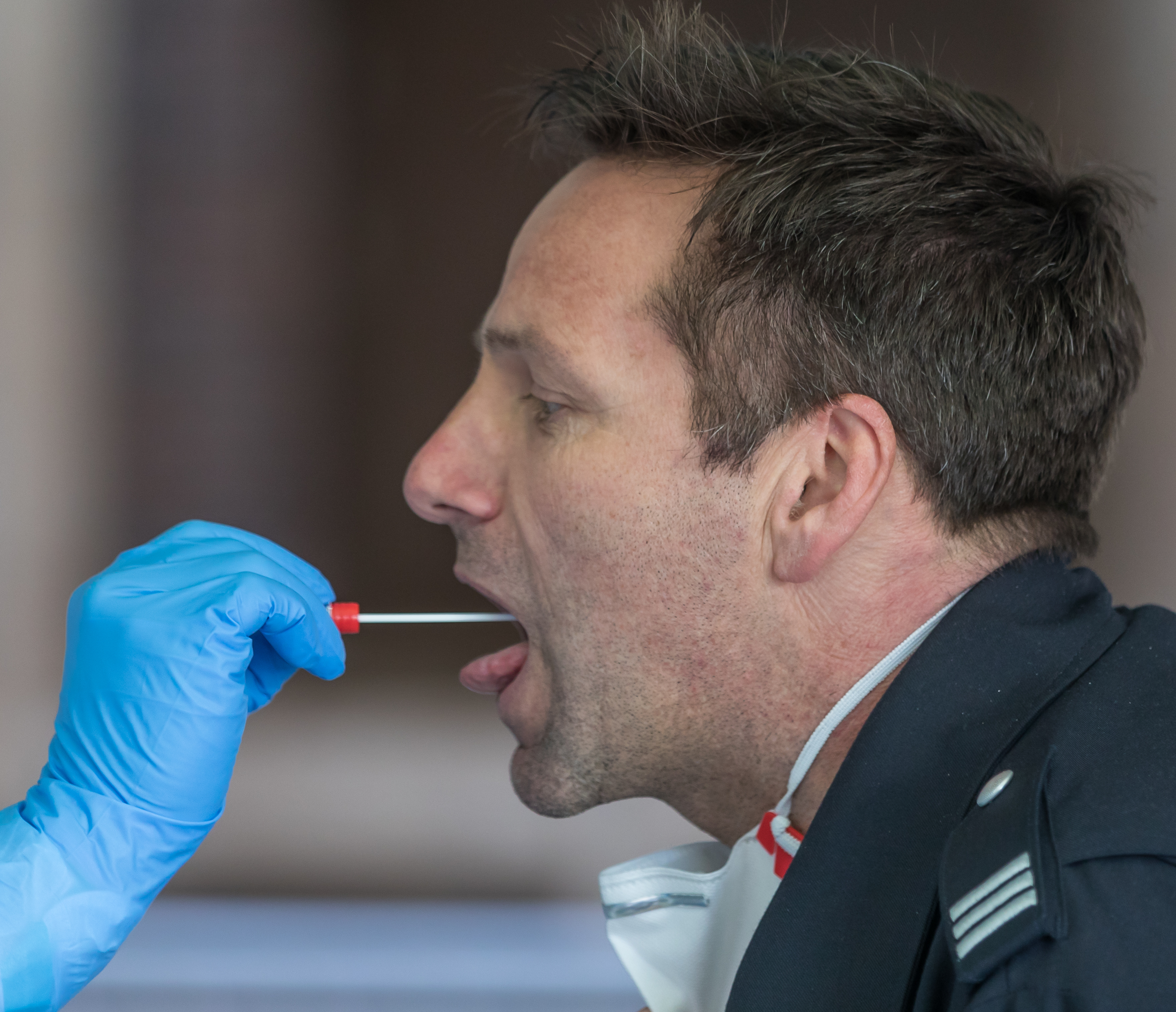
Demonstration of throat swab collection

The sampled matter can be analyzed for various components, for example:

- Electrolytes
- Proteins
- cells, such as white blood cells in blood sampling
- Microbiological agents, such as bacteria or fungi

=== Microbiological sampling ===
Microbiological sampling include:

- Blood sampling for blood cultures, performed similarly as that for tests on the fluid itself above
- Throat swab for throat culture. It is performed by applying a cotton swab to the surface of the throat.
- Sampling of sputum from the lungs for sputum culture. It can be performed by special techniques of coughing, or by a protected specimen brush (PSB), which is a brush that can be retracted into a plastic tube to prevent contamination of bacteria in the throat while inserting and removing the instrument.
