= Radial artery puncture =

Medical procedure

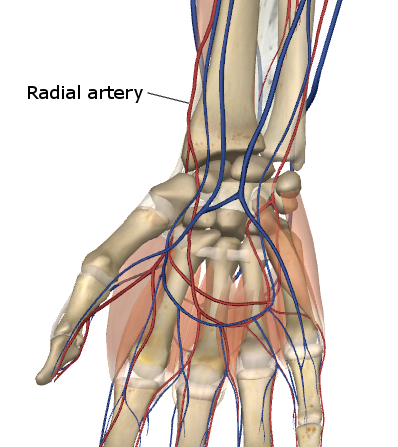
The right radial artery.

Radial artery puncture is a medical procedure performed to obtain a sample of arterial blood for gas analysis. A needle is inserted into the radial artery (usually at the so-called gouttiére du pouls) and spontaneously fills with blood. The syringe is either prepacked with a small amount of heparin to prevent coagulation, or must be heparinised, by drawing up a small amount of heparin and squirting it out again.. The available evidence suggests that the use of local anaesthesia, prior to arterial puncture, does not reduce the perceived pain of the procedure.
