= Hyperventilation =

Excessive breathing

- Other names: Overbreathing
- Specialty: Pulmonology
- Symptoms: Rapid breathing to the point where the body eliminates more carbon dioxide than it can produce
- Complications: Fainting

Hyperventilation or overbreathing is breathing at a higher frequency (i.e. tachypnea) and overall volume than the normal range for a healthy individual. Physiological hyperventilation or panting is a normal metabolic response to exercises that occurs when the respiratory center of the central nervous system increases both the respiratory rate and tidal volume to supply more oxygen for the body's cellular respiration and remove carbon dioxide as a metabolic waste, and it is also a mode of evaporative thermoregulation in many terrestrial animals (e.g. dogs). Pathological hyperventilation, on the other hand, is a sign of stress responses either due to an underlying respiratory illness or due to disorders in other body systems that have triggered a respiratory compensation, and is often accompanied by the symptom of shallow, uncomfortable and sometimes agonized breathing effort commonly known as "shortness of breath" and "gasping". It is treatable by raising the levels of CO_{2} in the blood.

== Causes of hyperventilation ==
Prolonged or excessive hyperventilation can lead to respiratory alkalosis, in which the increased ventilation eliminates more carbon dioxide than the body can produce. This leads to hypocapnia, a reduced concentration of dissolved carbon dioxide in the blood plasma, which causes a raised blood pH due to shifted chemical equilibrium. At the initial stages, the body normally attempts to homeostatically compensate for this alkalosis via renal compensation, but if this fails and the body's other physiological reserves are overwhelmed, the alkalosis can shift the oxygen–hemoglobin dissociation curve and makes it harder for oxygen to be released from the blood stream into body tissues, resulting in hypoxia. The symptoms of respiratory alkalosis include dizziness, headache, weakness, tingling in the lips, hands or feet, fainting, and seizures. In extreme cases, it may cause carpopedal spasms, a flapping and contraction of the hands and feet.

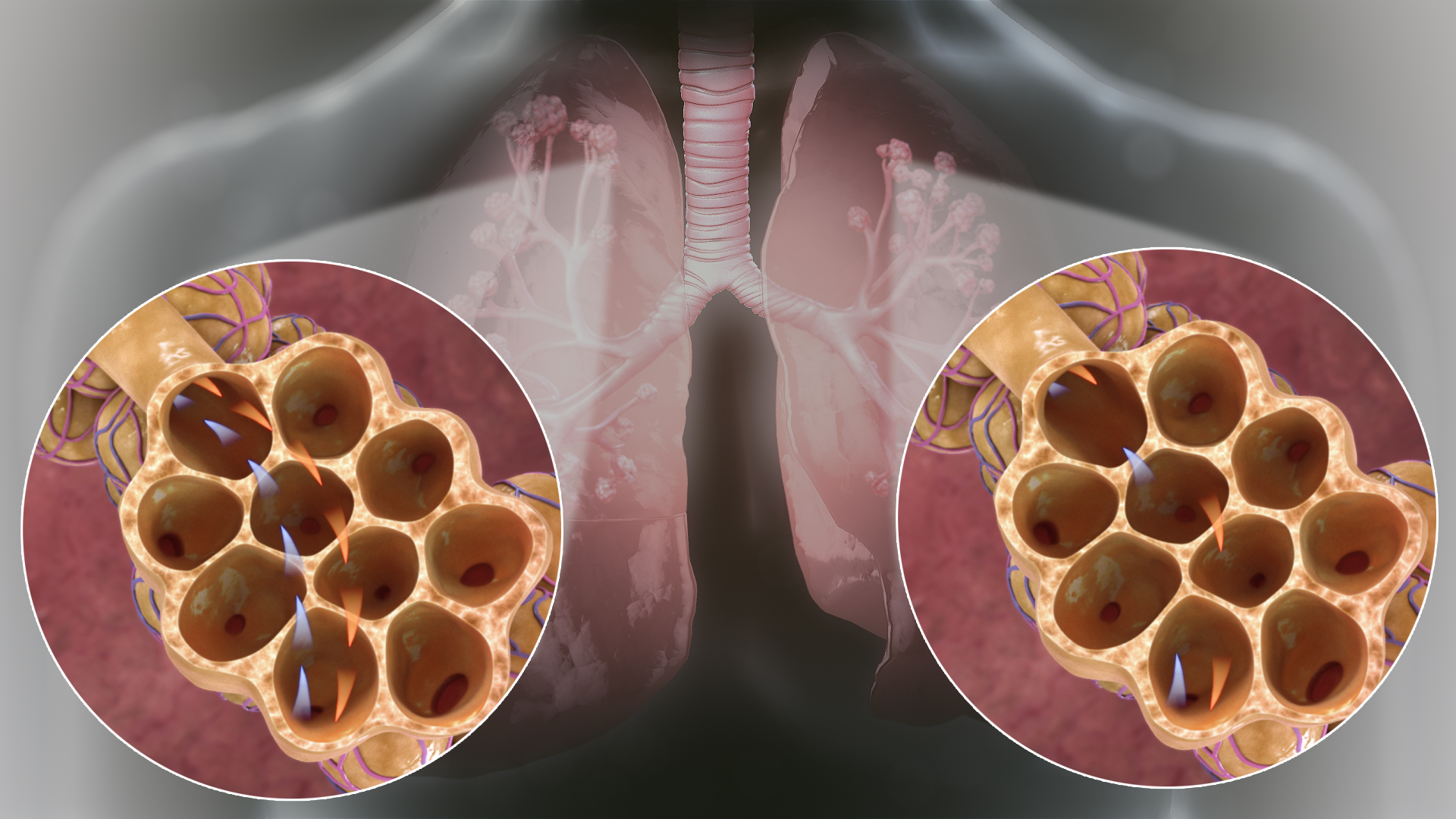
Hyperventilation (left) showing the increased levels of breathing and the decreased levels of carbon dioxide in the body compared to Hyperpnea (right), where breathing increases when the body is in need of oxygen without altering carbon dioxide levels.

Factors that may induce or sustain hyperventilation include physiological stress, anxiety or panic disorder, high altitude, head injury, stroke, anemia, an incorrectly calibrated medical respirator, and adverse reactions to certain drugs. Additionally, cardiovascular diseases such as pulmonary embolisms and respiratory disorders such as asthma, pneumonia, or hyperventilation syndrome may have similar effects. Hyperventilation can also be induced intentionally to achieve an altered state of consciousness such as in the choking game, during breathwork, or in an attempt to extend a breath-hold dive.

== Treatments of hyperventilation ==
Treating hyperventilation requires the levels of carbon dioxide within the bloodstream to be raised. To do so during the moment of an episode, breathing patterns should be altered as to restore natural carbon dioxide levels within the body. Altered breathing patterns can include breathing through a singular nostril, pursed lips, or taking pauses between inhales and exhales. These patterns should be repeated three to ten times or until hyperventilation symptoms begin to fade. To aid in soothing or preventing future episodes of hyperventilation, action can be taken in the present by learning breathing exercises, relaxation techniques, and beginning regular exercise.

If episodes of hyperventilation are frequent with unusually long episodes, tests can be run to reveal any underlying physical issues causing these anomalies. Additionally, any mental health causes can be found through testing done by psychologists.

== See also ==
- Choking game, a game which may involve hyperventilation to induce temporary syncope and euphoria
- Control of respiration
- Kussmaul breathing
- List of terms of lung size and activity
- Respiratory alkalosis
- Shallow water blackout, the role of hyperventilation in some drowning incidents
