= Respiratory acidosis =

Decrease in blood pH due to insufficient breathing

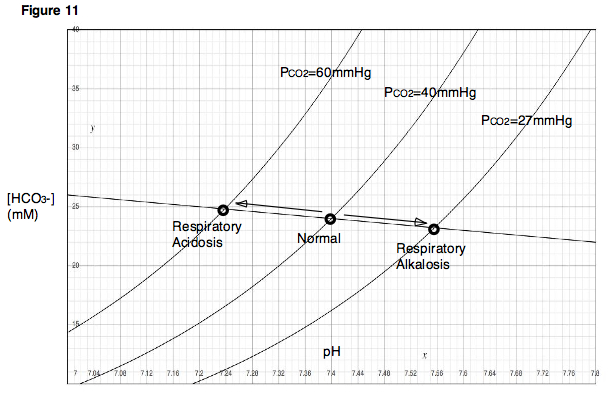
- Davenport diagram
- Specialty: Intensive care medicine, pulmonology, internal medicine

Respiratory acidosis is a state in which decreased ventilation (hypoventilation) increases the concentration of carbon dioxide in the blood and decreases the blood's pH (a condition generally called acidosis).

Carbon dioxide is produced continuously as the body's cells respire, and this CO_{2} will accumulate rapidly if the lungs do not adequately expel it through alveolar ventilation. Alveolar hypoventilation thus leads to an increased pCO_{2} (a condition called hypercapnia). The increase in pCO_{2} in turn decreases the HCO_{3}^{–}/pCO_{2} ratio and decreases pH.

== Types ==
Respiratory acidosis can be acute or chronic.

- In acute respiratory acidosis, the PaCO_{2} is elevated above the upper limit of the reference range (over 6.3 kPa or 45 mmHg) with an accompanying acidemia (pH < 7.35).
- In chronic respiratory acidosis, the PaCO_{2} is elevated above the upper limit of the reference range, with a normal blood pH (7.35 to 7.45) or near-normal pH secondary to renal compensation and an elevated serum bicarbonate (HCO_{3}^{–} > 30 mEq/L).

== Causes ==
=== Acute ===
Acute respiratory acidosis occurs when an abrupt failure of ventilation occurs. This failure in ventilation may be caused by depression of the central respiratory center by cerebral disease or drugs, inability to ventilate adequately due to neuromuscular disease (such as myasthenia gravis, amyotrophic lateral sclerosis, Guillain–Barré syndrome, muscular dystrophy), or airway obstruction related to asthma or chronic obstructive pulmonary disease (COPD) exacerbation.

=== Chronic ===
Chronic respiratory acidosis may be secondary to many disorders, including COPD. Hypoventilation in COPD involves multiple mechanisms, including decreased responsiveness to hypoxia and hypercapnia, increased ventilation-perfusion mismatch leading to increased dead space ventilation, and decreased diaphragm function secondary to fatigue and hyperinflation.

Chronic respiratory acidosis also may be secondary to obesity hypoventilation syndrome (Pickwickian syndrome), neuromuscular disorders such as amyotrophic lateral sclerosis, and severe restrictive ventilatory defects as observed in interstitial lung disease and thoracic deformities.

Lung diseases that primarily cause abnormality in alveolar gas exchange usually do not cause hypoventilation but tend to cause stimulation of ventilation and hypocapnia secondary to hypoxia. Hypercapnia only occurs if severe disease or respiratory muscle fatigue occurs.

== Physiological response ==
=== Mechanism ===
Metabolism rapidly generates a large quantity of volatile acid (H_{2}CO_{3}) and nonvolatile acid. The metabolism of fats and carbohydrates leads to the formation of a large amount of CO_{2}. The CO_{2} combines with H_{2}O to form carbonic acid (H_{2}CO_{3}). The lungs normally excrete the volatile fraction through ventilation, and acid accumulation does not occur. A significant alteration in ventilation that affects elimination of CO_{2} can cause a respiratory acid-base disorder. The PaCO_{2} is maintained within a range of 35–45 mmHg in normal states.

Alveolar ventilation is under the control of the respiratory center, which is located in the pons and the medulla. Ventilation is influenced and regulated by chemoreceptors for PaCO_{2}, PaO_{2}, and pH located in the brainstem, and in the aortic and carotid bodies as well as by neural impulses from lung stretch receptors and impulses from the cerebral cortex. Failure of ventilation quickly increases the PaCO_{2}.

In acute respiratory acidosis, compensation occurs in 2 steps.

- The initial response is cellular buffering (plasma protein buffers) that occurs over minutes to hours. Cellular buffering elevates plasma bicarbonate (HCO_{3}^{–}) only slightly, approximately 1 mEq/L for each 10-mm Hg increase in PaCO_{2}.
- The second step is renal compensation that occurs over 3–5 days. With renal compensation, renal excretion of carbonic acid is increased and bicarbonate reabsorption is increased. For instance, PEPCK is upregulated in renal proximal tubule brush border cells, in order to secrete more NH_{3} and thus to produce more HCO_{3}^{–}.

=== Estimated changes ===
In renal compensation, plasma bicarbonate rises 3.5 mEq/L for each increase of 10 mm Hg in PaCO_{2}. The expected change in serum bicarbonate concentration in respiratory acidosis can be estimated as follows:

- Acute respiratory acidosis: HCO_{3}^{–} increases 1 mEq/L for each 10 mm Hg rise in PaCO_{2}.
- Chronic respiratory acidosis: HCO_{3}^{–} rises 3.5 mEq/L for each 10 mm Hg rise in PaCO_{2}.

The expected change in pH with respiratory acidosis can be estimated with the following equations:

- Acute respiratory acidosis: Change in pH = 0.08 × ((40 − PaCO_{2})/10)
- Chronic respiratory acidosis: Change in pH = 0.03 × ((40 − PaCO_{2})/10)

Respiratory acidosis does not have a great effect on electrolyte levels. Some small effects occur on calcium and potassium levels. Acidosis decreases binding of calcium to albumin and tends to increase serum ionized calcium levels. In addition, acidemia causes an extracellular shift of potassium, but respiratory acidosis rarely causes clinically significant hyperkalemia.

== Diagnosis ==
Diagnoses can be done by doing an ABG (Arterial Blood Gas) laboratory study, with a pH < 7.35 and a PaCO_{2} > 45 mmHg in an acute setting. Patients with COPD and other Chronic respiratory diseases will sometimes display higher level of PaCO_{2} with HCO_{3}^{–} > 30 and normal pH.

== Terminology ==
- Acidosis refers to disorders that lower cell/tissue pH to < 7.35.
- Acidemia refers to an arterial pH < 7.36.

== See also ==
- Acidosis
- Alkalosis
- Arterial blood gas
- Hypercapnia
- Chemical equilibrium
- pCO_{2}
- pH
- pK_{a}
- Metabolic acidosis
- Metabolic alkalosis
- Respiratory alkalosis
