= Respiratory alkalosis =

Increase in blood pH due to rapid breathing

- Other names: Alkalosis - respiratory
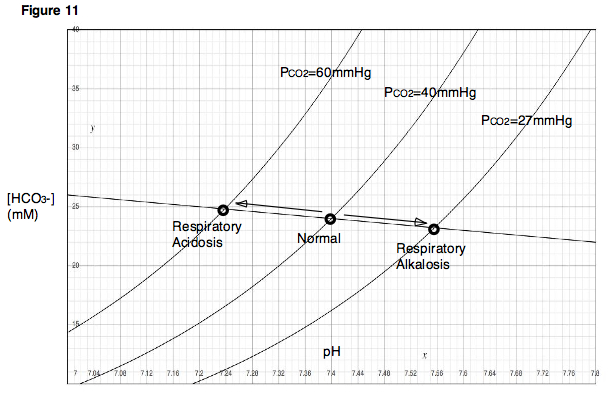
- Davenport diagram outlines pH and bicarbonate levels
- Specialty: Pulmonology, Anaesthesia
- Symptoms: Tetany, palpitation
- Causes: Hyperventilation, Pulmonary disorder
- Diagnostic method: Chest x-ray, Pulmonary function tests
- Treatment: Detect underlying cause

Respiratory alkalosis is a medical condition in which increased respiration elevates the blood pH beyond the normal range (7.35–7.45) with a concurrent reduction in arterial levels of carbon dioxide. This condition is one of the four primary disturbances of acid–base homeostasis.

Respiratory compensation is also a condition where increased respiration reduces carbon dioxide sometimes to level below the normal range. In this case it is a physiological response to low pH from metabolic processes and not the primary disorder.

== Signs and symptoms ==
PVC (a type of palpitation) recording
An audio clip recording of a PVC symptom, made with a cardiac event monitor.

Signs and symptoms of respiratory alkalosis are as follows:

- Palpitation
- Tetany
- Convulsion
- Sweating

== Causes ==
Respiratory alkalosis may be produced as a result of the following causes:

- Stress
- Pulmonary disorder
- Thermal insult
- High altitude areas
- Salicylate poisoning (aspirin overdose)
- Fever
- Hyperventilation (due to heart disorder or other, including improper mechanical ventilation)
- Vocal cord paralysis (compensation for loss of vocal volume results in over-breathing/breathlessness).
- Liver disease

== Mechanism ==
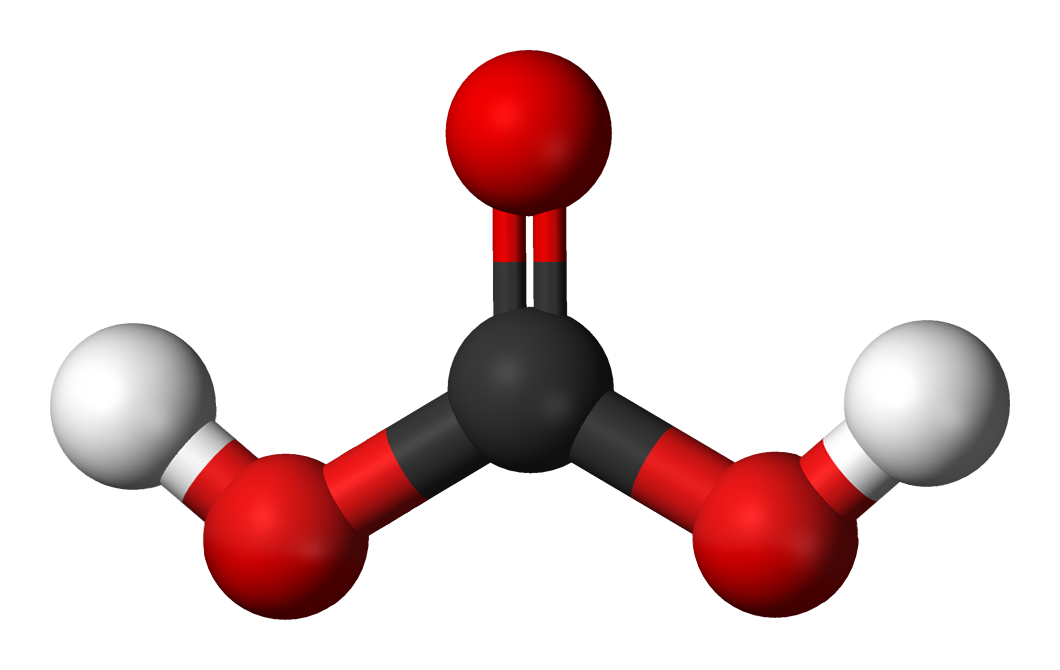
Carbonic-acid

The mechanism of respiratory alkalosis generally occurs when some stimulus makes a person hyperventilate. The increased breathing produces increased alveolar respiration, expelling CO_{2} from the circulation. This alters the dynamic chemical equilibrium of carbon dioxide in the circulatory system. Circulating hydrogen ions and bicarbonate are shifted through the carbonic acid (H_{2}CO_{3}) intermediate to make more CO_{2} via the enzyme carbonic anhydrase according to the following reaction: $\rm HCO_3^- + H^+ \rightarrow H_2CO_3 \rightarrow CO_2 + H_2O$

This causes decreased circulating hydrogen ion concentration, and increased pH (alkalosis).

== Diagnosis ==
The diagnosis of respiratory alkalosis is done via a test that measures the oxygen and carbon dioxide levels (in the blood), a chest x-ray, and a pulmonary function test of the individual.The Davenport diagram is named after Horace W Davenport a teacher and physiologist which allows theoreticians and teachers to graphically describe acid base chemistry. It is not used by clinicians who prefer a practical rather than a theoretical approach

=== Classification ===
There are two types of respiratory alkalosis: chronic and acute as a result of the 3–5 day delay in kidney compensation of the abnormality.

- Acute respiratory alkalosis occurs rapidly, and has a high pH because the response of the kidneys is slow.
- Chronic respiratory alkalosis is a more long-standing condition, here one finds the kidneys have time to decrease the bicarbonate level.

==== pH ====
- Acidemia is serum pH < 7.35.
- Alkalemia is serum pH > 7.45.

An acidosis is a physiologic process that increases hydrogen ion concentration.An alkalosis is a physiologic process that decreases hydrogen ion concentration.

== Treatment ==
Respiratory alkalosis is very rarely life-threatening, though pH level should not be 7.5 or greater. The aim in treatment is to detect the underlying cause. When PaCO2 is adjusted rapidly in individuals with chronic respiratory alkalosis, metabolic acidosis may occur. If the individual is on a mechanical ventilator then preventing hyperventilation is done via monitoring ABG levels.

== Society and culture ==
In The Andromeda Strain, one of the characters is exposed to contamination, but saves himself by increasing his respiratory rate to induce alkalosis.

== See also ==
- Acidosis
- Alkalosis
- Arterial blood gas
- Chemical equilibrium
- Hypocalcemia
- Metabolic acidosis
- Metabolic alkalosis
- pCO2
- pH
- pKa
- Respiratory acidosis
