= PCO2 =

Partial pressure of carbon dioxide, often used in reference to blood

Carbon dioxide molecule.

pCO_{2}, or $P_\ce{CO2}$, depending on the context and use, is the partial pressure of carbon dioxide (CO_{2}). It can refer to blood physiology or to atmospheric chemistry and geochemistry, including meteorology, climate science, hydrochemistry, oceanography, and limnology to describe the fractional pressure of CO_{2} as a function of its concentration in gas or dissolved phases. The units of pCO_{2}, or $P_\ce{CO2}$, are pascal (Pa), bar (10^{5} Pa), atm (1.013 bar), mmHg, torr (1/760 atm, or ≅ 1 mmHg), or any other standard unit of pascal (MPa) or atmospheric pressure.

== Medicine ==
In medicine, the partial pressure of carbon dioxide in arterial blood is called $P_{a_\ce{CO2}}$ or PaCO_{2}. Measurement of $P_{a_\ce{CO2}}$ in the systemic circulation indicates the effectiveness of ventilation at the lungs' alveoli, given the diffusing capacity of the gas. It is a good indicator of respiratory function and the closely related factor of acid–base homeostasis, reflecting the amount of acid in the blood (without lactic acid). Normal values for humans are in the range of 35–45 mmHg. Values less than this may indicate hyperventilation and (if blood pH is greater than 7.45) respiratory alkalosis. Values greater than 45 mmHg may indicate hypoventilation, and (if blood pH is less than 7.35) respiratory acidosis.

== Geochemistry and aquatic sciences ==
In geochemistry and aquatic chemistry, the partial pressure of CO_{2}, generally denoted P_{CO2} (with an uppercase letter), is the pressure that a hypothetical or real gas phase composed solely of pure carbon dioxide would exert on the aqueous phase when the two phases are in thermodynamic equilibrium at the sample's temperature and pressure, as described by Henry's law and Raoult's law. The thermodynamic activity of CO_{2} gas is its fugacity (𝑓CO_{2}), which represents the non-ideal "effective" partial pressure of CO_{2} at higher total pressures and temperatures.

Oceanographers and limnologists use pCO_{2} to measure the amount of carbon dioxide dissolved in water, as well as to parameterize its flux into (influx) and out of (efflux) the atmosphere. Carbon dioxide reacts with water to form bicarbonate and carbonate ions, such that the relative solubility of carbon dioxide in water is greater than that of other unreactive gases (e.g. helium). As more carbon dioxide dissolves in water, its pCO_{2} rises until it equals the pCO_{2} of the overlying atmosphere. Conversely, a body of water with a pCO_{2} greater than that of the atmosphere effluxes carbon dioxide.

pCO_{2} is additionally affected by water temperature and salinity. Carbon dioxide is less soluble in warmer water than cooler water, so hot water will exhibit a larger pCO_{2} than cold water with the same concentration of carbon dioxide. pCO_{2} can be used to describe the inorganic carbon system of a body of water, together with other parameters such as pH, dissolved inorganic carbon, and alkalinity. Together, these parameters describe the concentration and speciation of inorganic carbon species (CO_{2}(aq), HCO_{3}^{−}, CO_{3}^{2−}) in water.

Biological processes such as respiration and photosynthesis affect and can be affected by aquatic pCO_{2}. Respiration degrades organic matter, releasing CO_{2} into the water column and increasing pCO_{2}. Photosynthesis assimilates inorganic carbon, thereby decreasing aquatic pCO_{2}.

== Notation in geochemistry ==
In contrast to the partial pressures of gases, which are often denoted by a lowercase letter in physical chemistry (e.g., pO_{2}, pN_{2}), P_{CO2} is commonly written with an uppercase letter in geochemistry.

The notation pCO_{2} with a lowercase letter is not recommended, as it can be confused with the Sørensen prefix p (p for power), as in the logarithmic p-scale used in analytical chemistry to denote very low numerical values, pX = -log_{10} X, as in pH = -log_{10} [ H^{+}], or pK = -log_{10} K, where [ H^{+}] is the effective concentration (mol/L) of hydronium ions in solution, or, more exactly, its chemical activity, and K corresponds to a reaction equilibrium constant. In Sørensen notation, pCO_{2} = -log [CO_{2}] = -log P_{CO2} = pP_{CO2}, which can cause severe confusion about the sign of the log value.

To avoid such confusion, a clear and unambiguous notation is necessary. There are several possibilities:

- P_{CO2} = 10^{-3.5} (bar, atm) = 3.16 × 10^{-4} (bar, atm) or 316 ppmv = 0.0316 vol.%,
  (about the atmospheric CO_{2} concentration in early 1970);
- log_{10} P_{CO2} (bar, atm) = -3.5;
- pP_{CO2} (bar, atm) = -log_{10} P_{CO2} (bar, atm) = -log_{10} 10^{-3.5} = +3.5.

The first two notations, which retain the true negative power sign (when P_{CO2} < 1 bar), are clear, whereas the third, with a positive sign, pP_{CO2} (which could be more simply written as pCO_{2}), is unusual and not recommended in geochemistry because it can cause considerable confusion about the sign of the logarithm.

In practice, negative values of log_{10} P_{CO2} (partial pressure of CO_{2}) in natural water are commonly reported in the scientific literature and in geochemistry textbooks, typically ranging from -1.5 to -5.5.

== See also ==
Medecine

- Acidosis
- Alkalosis
- Arterial blood gas
- Blood gas tension
- Hypercapnia

Geochemistry

- Carbon cycle
- Carbonate compensation depth
- Chemical equilibrium
- Lysocline
- pH
- xCO_{2}
