= Isabel Graham Bryce =

British public servant

Dame Isabel Graham Bryce DBE
- Born: Isabella Lorrain Smith; 30 April 1902; Belfast, Ireland, United Kingdom
- Died: 29 April 1997 (aged 94); Oxford, Oxfordshire, England
- Education: St Leonard's School
- Alma mater: University of Edinburgh
- Occupation: Public servant
- Years active: 1926–1997
- Spouse: Alexander Graham Bryce (m. 1934; died 1968)
- Children: 2

Dame Isabel Graham Bryce DBE (née Isabella Lorrain Smith; 30 April 1902 – 29 April 1997) was a British public servant. She was at first an investigator for the Industrial Fagitue Research before going to become HM inspector of factories. Bryce worked for the Women's Voluntary Service from 1938 to 1943 and at Harvard Fatigue Laboratory between 1943 and 1944. She also worked for organisations such as the National Council of Women of Great Britain, the Manchester Children's Hospital, the General Nursing Council, the Queen Victoria Hospital, the British Transport Hotels and the Independent Television Authority.

== Early life ==
On 30 April 1902, Bryce was born as Isabella Lorrain Smith to the pathology professor James Lorrain Smith and his wife Isabella (née Meek-Edmond) at Westbourne, Windsor Avenue, Belfast. She was the fourth of five children in the family. In her second year, the family moved to Manchester from Belfast in 1904 and later to Edinburgh in 1912. Bryce and her siblings were encouraged to support the enthusiasm of their mother for public service. She was first tutored at home before going to St Leonards School, St Andrews. Bryce graduated with a general Master of Arts degree from the University of Edinburgh.

== Career ==
Having been influenced by her father researching the effects of humidity and ventilation into cotton weaving sheds for the Home Office, she was made an investigator for the Industrial Fatigue Research Board in 1926, where she researched what the effects were of humidity in Leicester shoe factories. Under the experimental professor Frederic Bartlett, Bryce did a year conducting psychological research in Cambridge. She successfully applied for the position of HM inspector of factories in 1928, which was an unusual job for a woman to hold at the time as a man would typically do that work. Bryce worked in Manchester and London in her six years in the role and became interested in the cotton industry, earning experience of working conditions and how employees sought to adapt to the noisy conditions.

In 1934, she left the role and returned to work in the Women's Voluntary Service (WVS) in 1938 as a centre organiser arranging escorts to accompany child evacuees in the Manchester region at a time when the United Kingdom was preparing for war. Bryce lasted in the role until 1939. She and her children were evacuated to Toronto in 1940 but continued to work for the WVS in Ontario, Canada as director of organisation and subsequently as a technical advisor in the United States. Three years later, Bryce was appointed research fellow conducting research into pilot fatigue at Harvard Fatigue Laboratory from 1943 to 1944. Following the war, she went back to Manchester, becoming a member of the Federation of University Women, served as chair of the Manchester branch of the National Council of Women of Great Britain, and was on the board of the Manchester Children's Hospital when the National Health Service was introduced in 1948. Bryce took part in a study of nurses' work and helped develop a new curriculum in the training of nursery nurses.

She was appointed to the General Nursing Council for her concern about staff welfare and served as a magistrate in adult and juvenile courts. Bryce moved to East Grinstead, Sussex in 1955 and joined the Queen Victoria Hospital's HMC as well as the Eastman dental clinic's board to assist in beginning a dental auxiliaries programme. Bryce was invited to join the British Transport Hotels' board as a non-executive member, focusing on her concerns about the staff's living and working conditions. She also received an invitation to join the Independent Television Authority for five years, enjoying the work enough to accept a non-executive directorship for the Midlands-based contractors Associated Television.

Other posts Bryce held were chair of the Oxford Regional Hospital Board from 1967 to 1975, where she was also appointed as a lay member. National Nursing Staff Committee between 1967 and 1975, the NHS National Staff Committee from 1969 to 1975 when the service was being reorganised, and consulted the British Transport Hotels between 1979 and 1981. Post-1978, she held no official post but continued as a volunteer in organisations such as the League of Friends of the Radcliffe Infirmary, the Motor Neurone Disease Association and the Zonta International Women's Organisation.

== Personal life ==
In 1968, she was appointed DBE "for services to social and personnel administration." Bryce was married to the Manchester hospitals consultant and surgeon Alexander Graham Bryce from 25 January 1934 until his death on 24 October 1968. They had two children.

On 29 April 1997, the day before her 95th birthday, she died at the John Radcliffe Hospital. Oxford.

== Personality ==
In her entry in the Dictionary of National Biography, Alex Gatherer wrote, "Dame Isabel's natural gifts as a chairman combined well with her considerable experience of boards and committees and her concerns for staff welfare, and she saw her chairmanships as the high point of her career. She was tall, with a stately presence, and impressed those who met her." Veronica Du Feu wrote of Bryce in The Independent, "Isabel Graham Bryce was a tall and stately presence whose searching eyes remained clear and blue, reflecting her keen mind".
