= Peter A. Stewart =

Canadian physiologist (1921–1993)

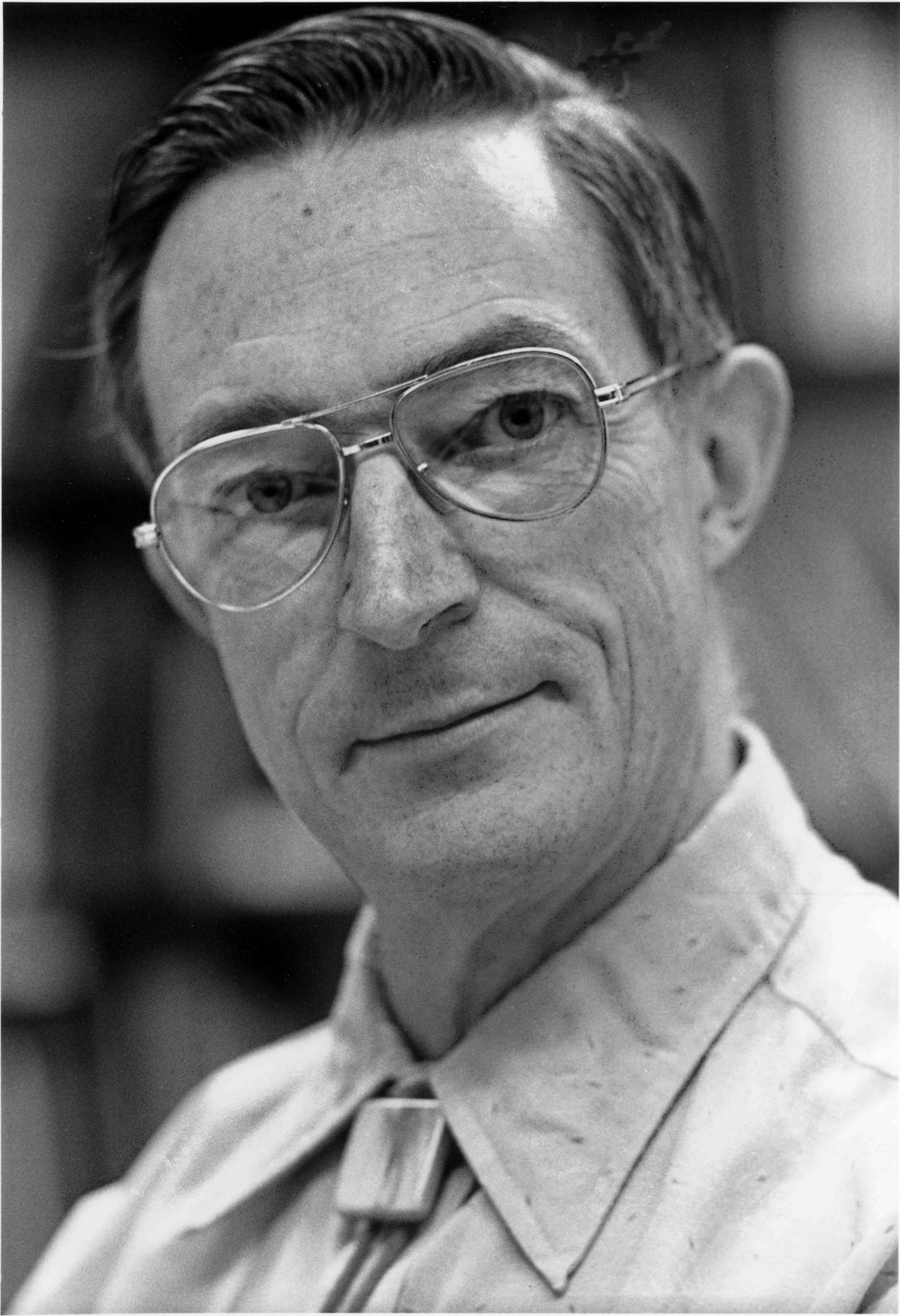
- Born: 1921; Winnipeg
- Died: 1993 (aged 71–72); Orcas Island
- Known for: Acid–base theory
- Scientific career
- Fields: Physiology
- Thesis: Some Effects of Altered Ion Environment on the Low-frequency Admittance Pattern of Nerve Membrane (1952)

Peter Arthur Robert Stewart (1921–1993) was a Canadian physiologist who introduced an alternate approach to understanding acid–base physiology.

He outlined his model in a paper in 1978, and explained it his 1981 book, How to Understand Acid–Base. The book was unavailable for many years, then made available on-line and finally reprinted in 2009, with additional chapters on current applications in clinical medicine.

The Stewart approach models the complex chemical equilibrium system known as acid–base balance. Stewart introduced the term "strong ion difference" or [SID] to mean the concentration of strongly dissociating cations minus the concentration of strongly dissociating anions. He characterised this, the total weak acid concentration and the partial pressure of CO_{2} as independent variables and formulated a quartic equation relating [H^{+}] to these three independent variables. The quartic equation was solved numerically by computer and has never been validated by titration or physiological experiments. The model ignores intracellular and extravascular compartments.

The impact of the Stewart analysis has been slow in coming but there has been a recent resurgence in interest, particularly as this approach provides explanations for several areas which are otherwise difficult to understand (e.g., dilutional acidosis, acid–base disorders related to changes in plasma albumin concentration).

== Criticism ==
Ole Siggaard-Andersen, author of the textbook, the Acid–Base Status of the Blood, wrote, "the Stewart approach is absurd and anachronistic." This is because Stewart began by characterising [SID], A_{TOT} and P_{CO_{2}} as independent variables, and [H^{+}] as the dependent variable of interest. He wrote down the equations for equilibrium concentrations derived from the law of mass action, and eliminated all other "dependent" variables. This naturally yielded an equation that phrased [H^{+}] in terms of [SID], A_{TOT} and P_{CO_{2}}, but people take it as support for the characterisation of variables as dependent and independent.

== Biographical information ==
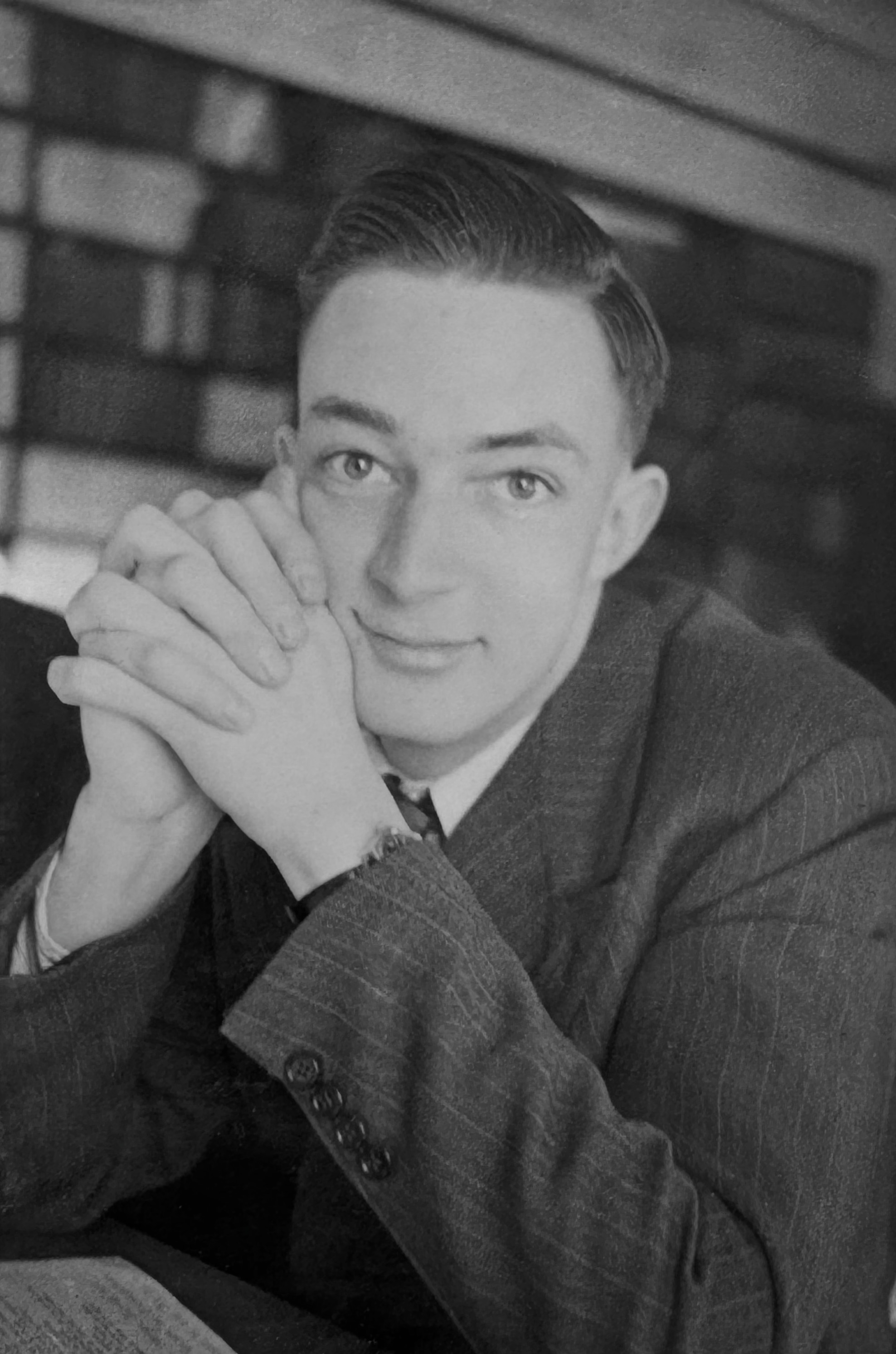
Peter A. Stewart as a student at the University of Manitoba

Peter was born in Winnipeg, Manitoba in 1921. He graduated with honours from the University of Manitoba in 1943 and served in World War II as a radar instructor. Post-graduate qualifications were obtained from the University of Minnesota: Master of Science in physics and mathematics in 1949, and a PhD in biophysics in 1951. In 1954, he took up a position as associate professor of physiology, Physics and Biometry at Emory University. In 1965, he joined Brown University as Professor of Medical Science.

He retired to Orcas Island in the Strait of Juan de Fuca near Seattle in 1983, and died in 1993.
