= Bicarbonate buffer system =

Buffer system that maintains pH balance in humans

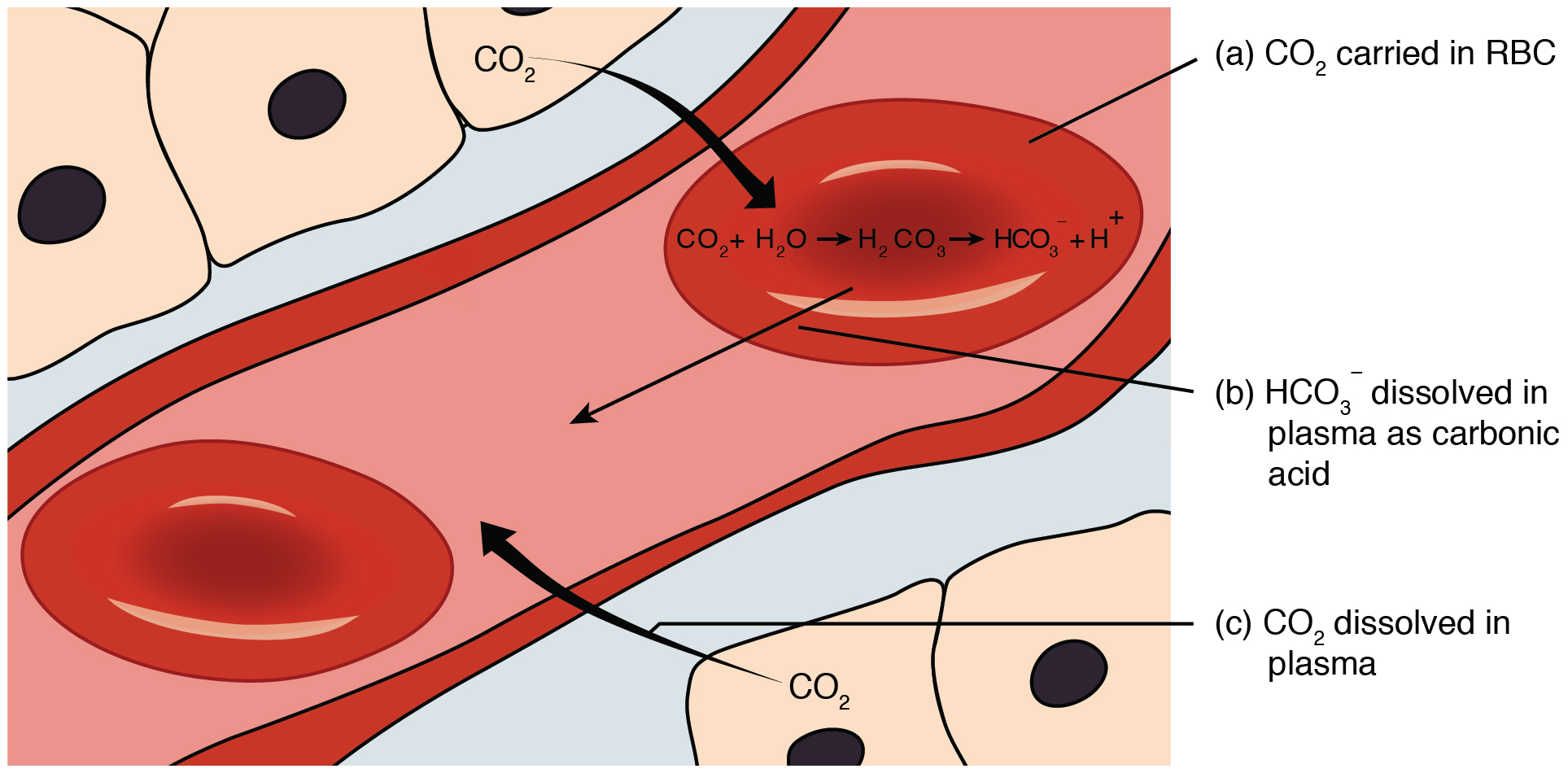
Carbon dioxide, a by-product of cellular respiration, is dissolved in blood, where it is taken up by red blood cells and converted to carbonic acid by carbonic anhydrase. Most of the carbonic acid then dissociates to bicarbonate and hydrogen ions.

The bicarbonate buffer system is an acid-base homeostatic mechanism involving the balance of carbonic acid (H_{2}CO_{3}), bicarbonate ion (HCO^{−}_{3}), and carbon dioxide (CO_{2}) in order to maintain pH in the blood and duodenum, among other tissues, to support proper metabolic function. Catalyzed by carbonic anhydrase, carbon dioxide (CO_{2}) reacts with water (H_{2}O) to form carbonic acid (H_{2}CO_{3}), which in turn rapidly dissociates to form a bicarbonate ion (HCO^{−}_{3} ) and a hydrogen ion (H^{+}) as shown in the following reaction:

$\rm CO_2 + H_2O \rightleftarrows H_2CO_3 \rightleftarrows HCO_3^- + H^+$

As with any buffer system, the pH is balanced by the presence of both a weak acid (for example, H_{2}CO_{3}) and its conjugate base (for example, HCO^{−}_{3}) so that any excess acid or base introduced to the system is neutralized.

Failure of this system to function properly results in acid-base imbalance, such as acidemia (pH < 7.35) and alkalemia (pH > 7.45) in the blood.

== In systemic acid–base balance ==
In tissue, cellular respiration produces carbon dioxide as a waste product; as one of the primary roles of the cardiovascular system, most of this CO_{2} is rapidly removed from the tissues by its hydration to bicarbonate ion. The bicarbonate ion present in the blood plasma is transported to the lungs, where it is dehydrated back into CO_{2} and released during exhalation. These hydration and dehydration conversions of CO_{2} and H_{2}CO_{3}, which are normally very slow, are facilitated by carbonic anhydrase in both the blood and duodenum. While in the blood, bicarbonate ion serves to neutralize acid introduced to the blood through other metabolic processes (e.g. lactic acid, ketone bodies); likewise, any bases are neutralized by carbonic acid (H_{2}CO_{3}).

=== Regulation ===
As calculated by the Henderson–Hasselbalch equation, in order to maintain a normal pH of 7.4 in the blood (whereby the pK_{a} of carbonic acid is 6.1 at physiological temperature), a 20:1 ratio of bicarbonate to carbonic acid must constantly be maintained; this homeostasis is mainly mediated by pH sensors in the medulla oblongata of the brain and probably in the kidneys, linked via negative feedback loops to effectors in the respiratory and renal systems. In the blood of most animals, the bicarbonate buffer system is coupled to the lungs via respiratory compensation, the process by which the rate and/or depth of breathing changes to compensate for changes in the blood concentration of CO_{2}. By Le Chatelier's principle, the release of CO_{2} from the lungs pushes the reaction above to the left, causing carbonic anhydrase to form CO_{2} until all excess protons are removed. Bicarbonate concentration is also further regulated by renal compensation, the process by which the kidneys regulate the concentration of bicarbonate ions by secreting H^{+} ions into the urine while, at the same time, reabsorbing HCO^{−}_{3} ions into the blood plasma, or vice versa, depending on whether the plasma pH is falling or rising, respectively.

=== Henderson–Hasselbalch equation ===
A modified version of the Henderson–Hasselbalch equation can be used to relate the pH of blood to constituents of the bicarbonate buffer system:

$$\ce{pH} = \textrm{p}K_{a~\ce{H_2CO_3}}+ \log \left ( \frac{[\ce{HCO_3^-}]}{[\ce{H_2CO_3}]} \right ),$$

where:

- pK_{a H_{2}CO_{3}} is the negative logarithm (base 10) of the acid dissociation constant of carbonic acid. It is equal to 6.1.
- [HCO^{−}_{3}] is the concentration of bicarbonate in the blood
- [H_{2}CO_{3}] is the concentration of carbonic acid in the blood

When describing arterial blood gas, the Henderson–Hasselbalch equation is usually quoted in terms of pCO_{2}, the partial pressure of carbon dioxide, rather than H_{2}CO_{3} concentration. However, these quantities are related by the equation:

$$[\ce{H_2CO_3}] = k_{\ce{H~CO_2}} \times p_\ce{CO_2},$$

where:

- [H_{2}CO_{3}] is the concentration of carbonic acid in the blood
- k_{H CO_{2}} is a constant including the solubility of carbon dioxide in blood. k_{H CO_{2}} is approximately 0.03 (mmol/L)/mmHg
- p_{CO_{2}} is the partial pressure of carbon dioxide in the blood

Combining these equations results in the following equation relating the pH of blood to the concentration of bicarbonate and the partial pressure of carbon dioxide:

$$\ce{pH} = 6.1 + \log \left ( \frac{[\ce{HCO_3^-}]}{0.0307 \times p_\ce{CO_2}} \right ),$$

where:

- pH is the acidity in the blood
- [HCO^{−}_{3}] is the concentration of bicarbonate in the blood, in mmol/L
- p_{CO_{2}} is the partial pressure of carbon dioxide in the blood, in mmHg

=== Derivation of the Kassirer–Bleich approximation ===
The Henderson–Hasselbalch equation, which is derived from the law of mass action, can be modified with respect to the bicarbonate buffer system to yield a simpler equation that provides a quick approximation of the H^{+} or HCO^{−}_{3} concentration without the need to calculate logarithms:

$K_{a,\ce{H_2CO_3}} = \frac{[\ce{HCO_3^-}] [\ce{H^+}]}{[\ce{H_2CO_3}]}$

Since the partial pressure of carbon dioxide is much easier to obtain from measurement than carbonic acid, the Henry's law solubility constant – which relates the partial pressure of a gas to its solubility – for CO_{2} in plasma is used in lieu of the carbonic acid concentration. After solving for H^{+} and applying Henry's law, the equation becomes:

$[\ce{H^+}] = \frac{K'\cdot0.03p_{\ce{CO_2}}}{[\ce{HCO_3^-}]},$

where K' is the dissociation constant of carbonic acid, which is equal to 800 nmol/L (since K' = 10^{−pKa_{H_{2}CO_{3}}} = 10^{−(6.1)} ≈ 8.00×10^{−7} mol/L = 800 nmol/L).

After multiplying the constants (800 × 0.03 = 24) and solving for HCO^{−}_{3}, the equation is simplified to:

$[\ce{HCO_3^-}] = 24\frac{p_{\ce{CO_2}}}{[\ce{H^+}]}$

where:

- [H^{+}] is the concentration of hydrogen ion in the blood, in nmol/L
- [HCO^{−}_{3}] is the concentration of bicarbonate in the blood, in mmol/L
- p_{CO_{2}} is the partial pressure of carbon dioxide in the blood, in mmHg

== In other tissues ==
The bicarbonate buffer system plays a vital role in other tissues as well. In the human stomach and duodenum, the bicarbonate buffer system serves to both neutralize gastric acid and stabilize the intracellular pH of epithelial cells via the secretion of bicarbonate ion into the gastric mucosa. In patients with duodenal ulcers, Helicobacter pylori eradication can restore mucosal bicarbonate secretion and reduce the risk of ulcer recurrence.

=== Tear buffering ===
The tears are unique among body fluids in that they are exposed to the environment. Much like other body fluids, tear fluid is kept in a tight pH range using the bicarbonate buffer system. The pH of tears shift throughout a waking day, rising "about 0.013 pH units/hour" until a prolonged closed-eye period causes the pH to fall again. Most healthy individuals have tear pH in the range of 7.0 to 7.7, where bicarbonate buffering is the most significant, but proteins and other buffering components are also present that are active outside of this pH range.
