= Lawrence Joseph Henderson =

American biochemist, philosopher and sociologist

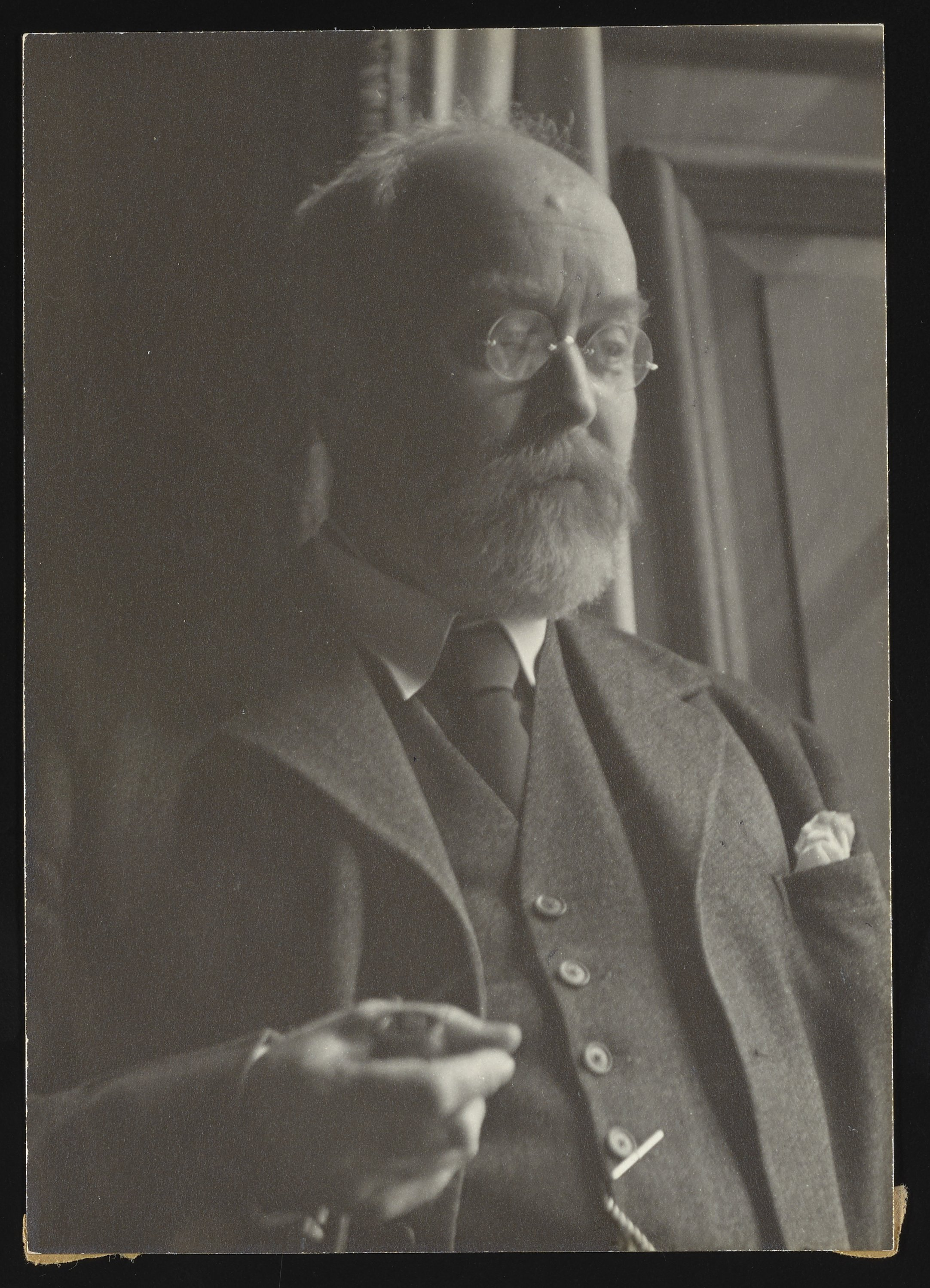
- Born: June 3, 1878; Lynn, Massachusetts
- Died: February 10, 1942 (aged 63); Cambridge, Massachusetts
- Education: Harvard Medical School
- Known for: The Fitness of the Environment, Henderson–Hasselbalch equation
- Scientific career
- Fields: physiology

Lawrence Joseph Henderson (June 3, 1878 – February 10, 1942) was an American physiologist, chemist, biologist, philosopher, and sociologist. He became one of the leading biochemists of the early 20th century. His work contributed to the Henderson–Hasselbalch equation, used to calculate pH as a measure of acidity.

== Early life ==
Lawrence Henderson was born in Lynn, Massachusetts the son of a businessman, Joseph Henderson and his wife. He entered Harvard at the age of 16 in 1894. His father was a ship chandler whose principal business was located in nearby Salem, but who also conducted business in Saint Pierre and Miquelon, a French Overseas collectivity off the coast of Canada.

== Career ==
Lawrence Henderson graduated from Harvard College in 1898 and from Harvard Medical School in 1902, receiving the M.D. (Medical Doctor) degree cum laude.

Then followed two years in chemical research at the University of Strasbourg with advanced scientific training in Franz Hofmeister's physiological laboratory. He became professor of biological chemistry, and later professor of chemistry, at Harvard University, Cambridge, Massachusetts. He was also introduced to philosophy and sociology by faculty members of Harvard University. He established several institutes at Harvard, especially the Harvard Fatigue Laboratory for physiological and sociological research on fatigue, with support from the Harvard Business School and the Harvard Medical School, and he became its director. He served as the first president of the History of Science Society from 1924 to 1925.

Henderson investigated acid-base regulation (1906–1920). He found that acid-base balance is regulated by buffer systems of the blood in complex coordination with respiration, the lung, red blood cells, and the kidneys. He wrote the Henderson equation in 1908 to describe the use of carbonic acid as a buffer solution. Karl Albert Hasselbalch later expressed the equation in logarithmic terms, formulating the Henderson–Hasselbalch equation. In addition, he described blood gas transport and the general physiology of blood as a physico-chemical system (1920–1932). He invented and constructed new charts, nomograms, with the help of Maurice d'Ocagne. He introduced nomograms into physiology and biology as well. The consequential inter-relations of various factors were shown in his book Blood in more than one hundred nomograms.

In 1913, Henderson wrote The Fitness of the Environment, one of the first books to explore concepts of fine tuning in the Universe. Henderson discusses the importance of water and the natural environment with respect to living things, pointing out that life depends entirely on the very specific environmental conditions on Earth, especially with regard to the prevalence and properties of water. In the book he wrote, "we find an inquiry into the biological significance of the properties of matter". He saw the properties of matter and the course of cosmic evolution intimately related to the structure of the living being and to its activities. He concluded: "the whole evolutionary process, both cosmic and organic, is one, and the biologist may now rightly regard the universe in its very essence as biocentric".

As a sociologist (1932–1942), he applied the functionalism of physiological regulation to the phenomena of social behavior, based on his concept of social systems. He described social systems with the help of the sociology of Vilfredo Pareto. In contrast to Pareto, Henderson applied the concept of social systems to all disciplines that study the meanings communicated in interactions between two or more persons acting in roles or role-sets. Henderson influenced many Harvard sociologists, especially Talcott Parsons, George C. Homans, Robert K. Merton, and Elton Mayo, who all became pioneers in sociology or psychology. Henderson was instrumental in promoting Talcott Parsons's career at Harvard despite Pitirim Sorokin's opposition. He also discussed intensively with Parsons the methodological chapters of Talcott Parsons's The Structure of Social Action (1937) at the time when Parsons was working on the raw manuscript.

Henderson's investigations had their inception and consummation in the philosopher's chair. In spite of his diversity of interests, his work exhibits in retrospect a fundamental unity; his career was largely devoted to the study of the organization of the organism, the universe, and society.

Henderson was elected to the American Academy of Arts and Sciences in 1912, the United States National Academy of Sciences in 1919, and the American Philosophical Society in 1921.

Henderson was an agnostic.

He died in Cambridge, Massachusetts on February 10, 1942.

== Books ==
- The Fitness of the Environment. Macmillan, New York, 1913 (German edition in 1914),
- The Order of Nature. Harvard University Press, Cambridge, London, 1917 (French edition in 1924),
- Blood. A Study in General Physiology. Yale University Press, New Haven, and Humphrey Milford, Oxford University Press, London, 1928 (French edition in 1931, German edition in 1932),
- Pareto's General Sociology. Harvard University Press, Cambridge, 1935.
- On the Social System. Ed. by Bernard Barber, University of Chicago Press, Chicago and London, 1970.
