= Acid–base disorder =

Abnormality of the human body's normal balance of acids and bases

Acid–base imbalance
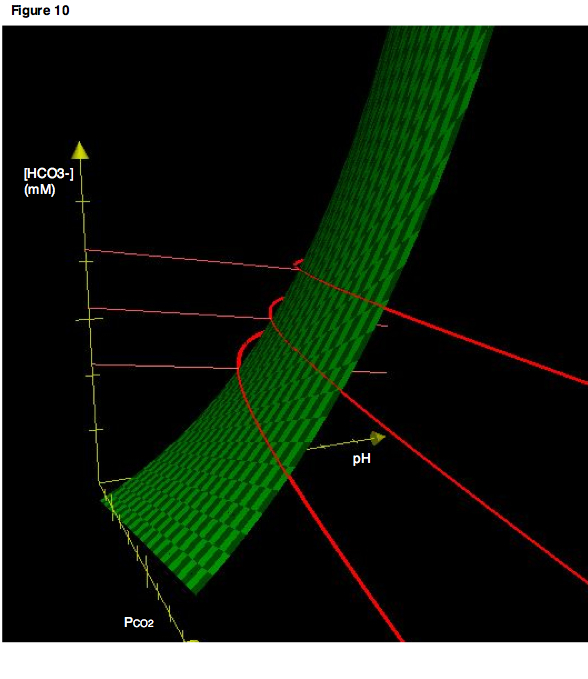
- A Davenport diagram illustrates acid–base imbalance graphically.
- Specialty: Internal medicine

Acid–base imbalance is an abnormality of the human body's normal balance of acids and bases that causes the plasma pH to deviate out of the normal range (7.35 to 7.45). In the fetus, the normal range differs based on which umbilical vessel is sampled (umbilical vein pH is normally 7.25 to 7.45; umbilical artery pH is normally 7.18 to 7.38). It can exist in varying levels of severity, some life-threatening.

== Classification ==
Blood gas, acid-base, and gas exchange terms
- P_{a}O_{2}: Arterial oxygen tension, or partial pressure
- P_{A}O_{2}: Alveolar oxygen tension, or partial pressure
- P_{a}CO_{2}: Arterial carbon dioxide tension, or partial pressure
- P_{A}CO_{2}: Alveolar carbon dioxide tension, or partial pressure
- P_{v}O_{2}: Oxygen tension of mixed venous blood
- P_{(A-a)}O_{2}: Alveolar-arterial oxygen tension difference. The term formerly used (A-a DO_{2}) is discouraged.
- P_{(a/A)}O_{2}: Alveolar-arterial tension ratio; P_{a}O_{2}:P_{A}O_{2} The term oxygen exchange index describes this ratio.
- C_{(a-v)}O_{2}: Arteriovenous oxygen content difference
- S_{a}O_{2}: Oxygen saturation of the hemoglobin of arterial blood
- S_{p}O_{2}: Oxygen saturation as measured by pulse oximetry
- C_{a}O_{2}: Oxygen content of arterial blood
- pH: Symbol relating the hydrogen ion concentration or activity of a solution to that of a standard solution; approximately equal to the negative logarithm of the hydrogen ion concentration. pH is an indicator of the relative acidity or alkalinity of a solution

An excess of acid is called acidosis or acidemia, while an excess in bases is called alkalosis or alkalemia. The process that causes the imbalance is classified based on the cause of the disturbance (respiratory or metabolic) and the direction of change in pH (acidosis or alkalosis). This yields the following four basic processes:

process	pH	CO_{2}	compensation
metabolic acidosis	▼	▼	respiratory
respiratory acidosis	▼	▲	renal
metabolic alkalosis	▲	▲	respiratory
respiratory alkalosis	▲	▼	renal

=== Mixed disorders ===
The presence of only one of the above derangements is called a simple acid–base disorder. In a mixed disorder, more than one is occurring at the same time. Mixed disorders may feature an acidosis and alkosis at the same time that partially counteract each other, or there can be two different conditions affecting the pH in the same direction. The phrase "mixed acidosis", for example, refers to metabolic acidosis in conjunction with respiratory acidosis. Any combination is possible, as metabolic acidosis and alkalosis can co exist together.

=== Calculation of imbalance ===
The traditional approach to the study of acid–base physiology has been the empirical approach. The main variants are the base excess approach and the bicarbonate approach. The quantitative approach introduced by Peter A Stewart in 1978 is newer.

== Causes ==
There are numerous reasons that each of the four processes can occur (detailed in each article). Generally speaking, circumstances that lead to a lower pH (acidosis) include

1. Retention of carbon dioxide
2. Production of nonvolatile acids from the metabolism of proteins and other organic molecules
3. Loss of bicarbonate in feces or urine
4. Intake of acids or acid precursors

Causes for a higher pH (alkalosis) include:

1. Use of hydrogen ions in the metabolism of various organic anions
2. Loss of hydrogen ions via urine
3. Persistent vomiting during prenancy (hyperemesis).
4. Severe diarrhea leading to loss of HCO3–.
5. Carbon dioxide loss through hyperventilation

== Compensation ==
The body's acid–base balance is tightly regulated. Several buffering agents exist which reversibly bind hydrogen ions and impede any change in pH. Extracellular buffers include bicarbonate and ammonia, while proteins and phosphate act as intracellular buffers. The bicarbonate buffering system is especially key, as carbon dioxide (CO_{2}) can be shifted through carbonic acid (H_{2}CO_{3}) to hydrogen ions and bicarbonate (HCO_{3}^{−}) as shown below.

$$\ce{HCO_3^- + H+ <=> H2CO3 <=> CO2 + H2O}$$

Acid–base imbalances that overcome the buffer system can be compensated in the short term by changing the rate of ventilation. This alters the concentration of carbon dioxide in the blood, shifting the above reaction according to Le Chatelier's principle, which in turn alters the pH. For instance, if the blood pH drops too low (acidemia), the body will compensate by increasing breathing, expelling CO_{2}, and shifting the reaction above to the right such that fewer hydrogen ions are free–thus the pH will rise back to normal. For alkalemia, the opposite occurs.

The kidneys are slower to compensate, but renal physiology has several powerful mechanisms to control pH by the excretion of excess acid or base. In responses to acidosis, tubular cells reabsorb more bicarbonate from the tubular fluid, collecting duct cells secrete more hydrogen and generate more bicarbonate, and ammoniagenesis leads to increased formation of the NH_{3} buffer. In responses to alkalosis, the kidney may excrete more bicarbonate by decreasing hydrogen ion secretion from the tubular epithelial cells, and lowering rates of glutamine metabolism and ammonia excretion.
