= HH equation =

HH equation may refer to:

- Henderson–Hasselbalch equation
- Hodgkin–Huxley model
