= Gastric tonometry =

Medical diagnostic method

Gastric tonometry describes the measurement of the carbon dioxide (CO_{2}) level inside the stomach in order to assess the degree of blood flow to the stomach and bowel.

== Method ==
Gastric tonometry has been introduced as a novel method of monitoring tissue perfusion in critically ill patients. Tonometry is based on the principle that at equilibrium the partial pressure of a diffusible gas such as CO_{2} is the same in both the wall and lumen of a viscus. The technique therefore can estimate gut mucosal PCO_{2} by measuring gut luminal PCO_{2} at equilibrium. A saline-filled balloon made of CO_{2} permeable silicone attached to a sampling tube is introduced into the gastric lumen as a nasogastric tube would be. After an equilibration period, the fluid is sampled to measure PCO_{2}. Because the mucosal and systemic bicarbonate concentrations are equal, a modified Henderson–Hasselbalch equation may be used to calculate the intramucosal pH:

pH_{i} = 6.1 + log [HCO_{3}^{−}/0.03 × PCO_{2}].

Thus, only gastric luminal PCO_{2} is directly measured. Mucosal PCO_{2} is presumed to be proportional at equilibrium, and mucosal pH is calculated. PO_{2} and luminal pH play no role in these calculations. Proponents of this technique maintain that it is a relatively inexpensive noninvasive, tissue-specific method to evaluate the adequacy of tissue perfusion. It is of special value when used in the gastric lumen because splanchnic circulation is one of the vascular beds that is subject to early blood flow redistribution in shock states. Critics of the technique caution that while directly measured factors are usually accurate and calculated factors correspondingly reliable, the assumption that gut mucosal pH alterations are uniquely a function of mucosal hypoxia is not. Tonometry may adequately reflect the degree of tissue perfusion, but its accuracy as an index of tissue oxygenation is less reliable.

== Explanation ==
Measuring gut mucosal carbon dioxide has been used to detect decreased blood flow. Accumulation of carbon dioxide is predominantly a result of hypoperfusion and not hypoxia. Because the introduction of a nasogastric tube is almost routine in critically ill patients, measuring gastric carbon dioxide can be an easy method to monitor tissue perfusion. Gastric mucosal pH is measured according to an equation that assumes arterial bicarbonate equals intramucosal bicarbonate, an assumption that is not always valid. Given that the gastric mucosal carbon dioxide is the directly measured value, whereas the gastric mucosal pH is the derived and possibly inaccurate value, studies that used gastric pH to monitor perfusion may be inherently flawed. Most studies have failed to effectively affect gastric pH and, for this reason, failed to produce improvements in outcome. One study, by Gutierrez and colleagues, has shown that therapeutic interventions guided by gastric tonometry improved survival in critically ill patients. In a direct comparison of splanchnic-oriented therapy as guided by gastric tonometry with conventional shock management of trauma patients, there was no difference in mortality rates, organ dysfunction rates, or length of stay.

== History ==
After a surge in popularity, the use of gastric tonometry waned and it is currently found with less frequency in surgical ICUs.

== See also ==
- Tonometry
