= Acidosis =

Biological process which decreases blood pH

Acidosis is a health condition in which the blood or other body fluids are more acidic than usual.

== Acidemia ==
The term acidemia describes the state of low blood pH, when arterial pH falls below 7.35 (except in the fetus – see below) while acidosis is used to describe the processes leading to these states. The use of acidosis for a low pH creates an ambiguity in its meaning. The difference is important where a patient has factors causing both acidosis and alkalosis, wherein the relative severity of both determines whether the result is a high, low, or normal pH.

Alkalemia occurs at a pH of over 7.45. Arterial blood gas analysis and other tests are required to separate the main causes, which are clear in certain situations. For instance, a diabetic with ketoacidosis is a recognizable case where the main cause of acidemia is essentially obvious.

The rate of cellular metabolic activity affects and, at the same time, is affected by the pH of the body fluids. In mammals, the normal pH of arterial blood lies between 7.35 and 7.50 depending on the species (e.g., healthy human-arterial blood pH varies between 7.35 and 7.45).

== Signs and symptoms ==
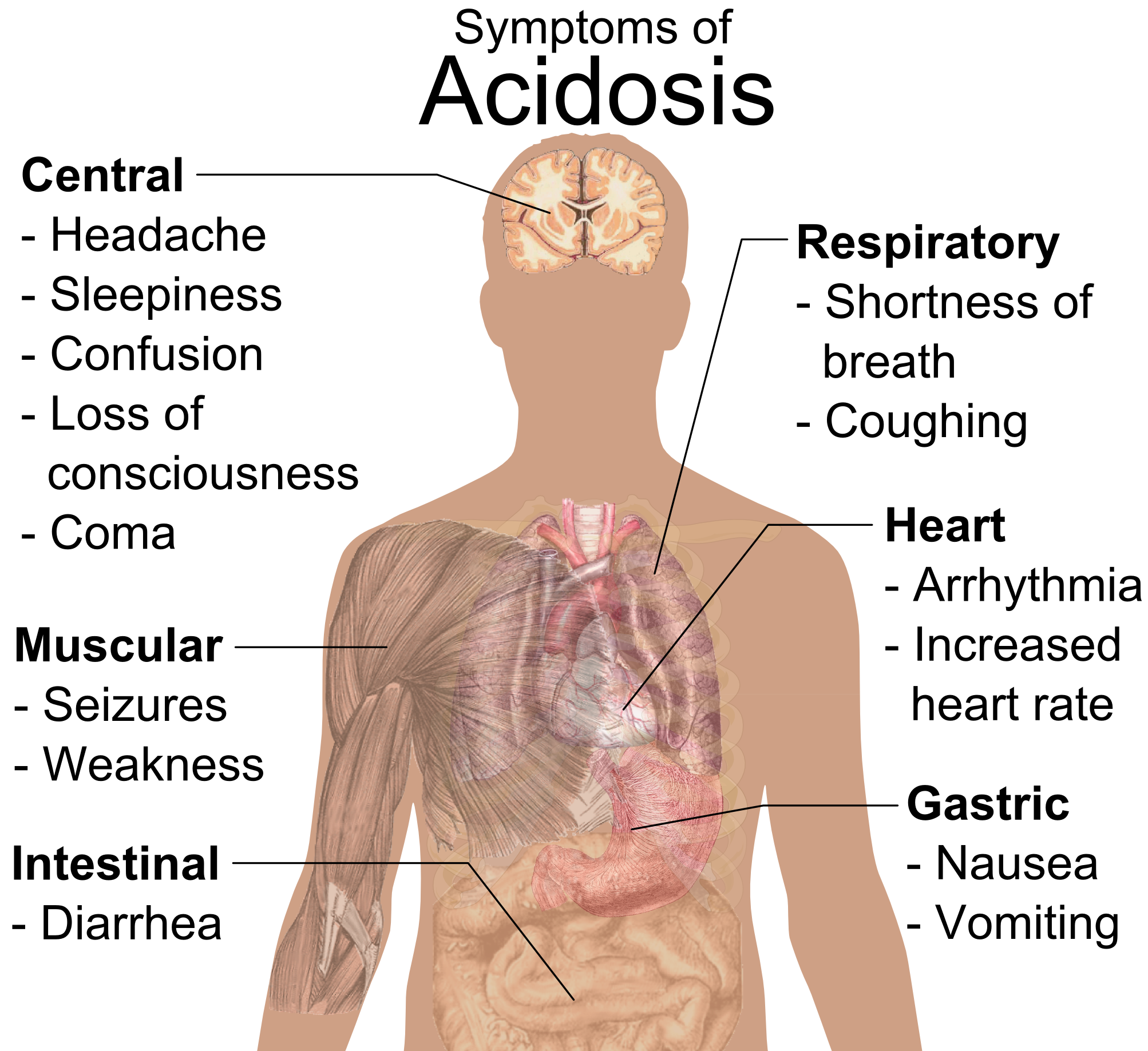
General symptoms of acidosis. These usually accompany symptoms of another primary defect (respiratory or metabolic).

Nervous system involvement may be seen with acidosis and occurs more often with respiratory acidosis than with metabolic acidosis. Signs and symptoms that may be seen in acidosis include headaches, confusion, feeling tired, tremors, sleepiness, flapping tremor, and dysfunction of the cerebrum of the brain which may progress to coma if there is no intervention.

In extreme cases symptoms can be anorexia, diabetes mellitus, chronic nephritis or pneumonia.

== Metabolic acidosis ==
Metabolic acidosis may result from either increased production of metabolic acids, such as lactic acid, or disturbances in the ability to excrete acid via the kidneys, such as either renal tubular acidosis or the acidosis of kidney failure, which is associated with an accumulation of urea and creatinine as well as metabolic acid residues of protein catabolism.

Lactic acidosis occurs whenever the demand for oxygen by tissues exceeds the supply and the more efficient aerobic metabolism is supplemented by anaerobic metabolism that produces lactate. Increased demand occurs, for example, with high intensity exercise such as sprinting. Inadequate supply occurs, for example, with hypoperfusion as occurs in hemorrhagic shock.

A rise in lactate out of proportion to the level of pyruvate, e.g., in mixed venous blood, is termed "excess lactate", and is an indicator of anaerobic glycolysis occurring in muscle cells, as seen during strenuous exercise. Once oxygenation is restored, the acidosis clears quickly. Another example of increased production of acids occurs in starvation and diabetic ketoacidosis. It is due to the accumulation of ketoacids (via excessive ketosis) and reflects a severe shift from glycolysis to lipolysis for energy needs.

Acid consumption from poisoning such as methanol ingestion, elevated levels of iron in the blood, and chronically decreased production of bicarbonate may also produce metabolic acidosis.

Metabolic acidosis is compensated for in the lungs, as increased exhalation of carbon dioxide promptly shifts the buffering equation to reduce metabolic acid. This is a result of stimulation to chemoreceptors, which increases alveolar ventilation, leading to respiratory compensation, otherwise known as Kussmaul breathing (a specific type of hyperventilation). Should this situation persist, the patient is at risk of exhaustion leading to respiratory failure.

Mutations to the V-ATPase 'a4' or 'B1' isoforms result in distal renal tubular acidosis, a condition that leads to metabolic acidosis, in some cases with sensorineural deafness.

Arterial blood gases will indicate low pH, low blood HCO_{3}, and normal or low PaCO_{2}. In addition to arterial blood gas, an anion gap can also differentiate between possible causes.

The Henderson-Hasselbalch equation is useful for calculating blood pH, because blood is a buffer solution. In the clinical setting, this equation is usually used to calculate HCO_{3} from measurements of pH and PaCO2 in arterial blood gases. The amount of metabolic acid accumulating can also be quantitated by using buffer base deviation, a derivative estimate of the metabolic as opposed to the respiratory component. In hypovolemic shock for example, approximately 50% of the metabolic acid accumulation is lactic acid, which disappears as blood flow and oxygen debt are corrected.

=== Treatment ===
Treatment of uncompensated metabolic acidosis is focused upon correcting the underlying problem. When metabolic acidosis is severe and can no longer be compensated for adequately by the lungs or kidneys, neutralizing the acidosis with infusions of bicarbonate may be required.

=== Fetal metabolic acidemia ===
In the fetus, the normal range differs based on which umbilical vessel is sampled (umbilical vein pH is normally 7.25 to 7.45; umbilical artery pH is normally 7.18 to 7.38). Fetal metabolic acidemia is defined as an umbilical vessel pH of less than 7.20 and a base excess of less than −8.

== Respiratory acidosis ==
Respiratory acidosis results from a build-up of carbon dioxide in the blood (hypercapnia) due to hypoventilation. It is most often caused by pulmonary problems, although head injuries, drugs (especially anaesthetics and sedatives), and brain tumors can cause this acidemia. Pneumothorax, emphysema, chronic bronchitis, asthma, severe pneumonia, and aspiration are among the most frequent causes. It can also occur as a compensatory response to chronic metabolic alkalosis.

One key to distinguish between respiratory and metabolic acidosis is that in respiratory acidosis, the CO_{2} is increased while the bicarbonate is either normal (uncompensated) or increased (compensated). Compensation occurs if respiratory acidosis is present, and a chronic phase is entered with partial buffering of the acidosis through renal bicarbonate retention.

However, in cases where chronic illnesses that compromise pulmonary function persist, such as late-stage emphysema and certain types of muscular dystrophy, compensatory mechanisms will be unable to reverse this acidotic condition. As metabolic bicarbonate production becomes exhausted, and extraneous bicarbonate infusion can no longer reverse the extreme buildup of carbon dioxide associated with uncompensated respiratory acidosis, mechanical ventilation will usually be applied.

=== Fetal respiratory acidemia ===
In the fetus, the normal range differs based on which umbilical vessel is sampled (umbilical vein pH is normally 7.25 to 7.45; umbilical artery pH is normally 7.20 to 7.38). In the fetus, the lungs are not used for ventilation. Instead, the placenta performs ventilatory functions (gas exchange). Fetal respiratory acidemia is defined as an umbilical vessel pH of less than 7.20 and an umbilical artery PCO_{2} of 66 or higher or umbilical vein PCO_{2} of 50 or higher.

== See also ==
- Acid–base homeostasis
- Acid–base imbalance
- Alkalinizing agent
- Alkaline diet
- Arterial blood gas
- Chemical equilibrium
- Lactic acidosis
- pCO2
- pKa
