= Karl Albert Hasselbalch =

Danish scientist

- Born: Karl Albert Hasselbalch; 1 November 1874; Åstrup, Denmark
- Died: 19 September 1962 (aged 87)
- Known for: Henderson–Hasselbalch equation
- Spouse(s): Nanna Ida Elisabeth Heerfordt (1904); Antonie Sophie Hagemann (1906)

Karl Albert Hasselbalch (Danish pronunciation: [ˈkʰɑˀl ˈælˀpɐt ˈhæsl̩ˌpælˀk]; 1 November 1874 – 19 September 1962) was a Danish physician and chemist known for his work on the Henderson–Hasselbalch equation.

== Early life and education ==
Hasselbalch was born in Åstrup, near Hjørring, Denmark, on 1 November 1874. His parents were landowner and lawyer Hans Peter Jansen Hasselbalch (1843–1916) and Hedevig Alberta Rebekka Spärck (1845–1876). In 1879, his father remarried to Wilhelmine Marie Koppel (1858–1950). Hasselbalch received his medical degree in 1898 and his doctorate in 1899 for his thesis on the respiratory metabolism in the chicken embryo.

== Career ==
Hasselbalch was a pioneer in the use of pH measurement in medicine (with Christian Bohr, father of Niels Bohr), and he described how the affinity of blood for oxygen was dependent on the concentration of carbon dioxide. He was also the first to determine the pH of blood. In 1916, he converted the 1908 equation of Lawrence Joseph Henderson to logarithmic form, which is now known as the Henderson–Hasselbalch equation.

== Personal life ==
Hasselbalch married Nanna Ida Elisabeth Heerfordt on July 26, 1904, in Hjørring.

He remarried Antonie Sophie Hagemann, daughter of Gustav Adolph Hagemann, on December 5th of 1906. Through this marriage, he inherited Hagemann's Borupgård at Snekkersten. Together, they had six children, including Danish director Hagen Hasselbalch and Anders Hasselbalch, who died in 1929 and in whose honor Hasselbalch created the Anders Hasselbalch Fund to Fight Leukemia.

Hasselbalch purchased Grønnessegaard in 1921. Eight years later, he bought Heimdal near Sønder Omme.
