= Ion trapping =

In cell biology, ion trapping is the build-up of a higher concentration of a chemical across a cell membrane due to the pK_{a} value of the chemical and difference of pH across the cell membrane. This results in basic chemicals accumulating in acidic bodily fluids such as the cytosol, and acidic chemicals accumulating in basic fluids.

== Mechanism ==
Many cells have other mechanisms to pump a molecule inside or outside the cell against the concentration gradient, but these processes are active ones, meaning that they require enzymes and consume cellular energy. In contrast, ion trapping does not require any enzyme or energy. It is similar to osmosis in that they both involve the semipermeable nature of the cell membrane.

Cells have a more acidic pH inside the cell than outside (gastric mucosal cells being an exception). Therefore, basic drugs (like bupivacaine, pyrimethamine) are more charged inside the cell than outside. The cell membrane is permeable to non-ionized (fat-soluble) molecules; ionized (water-soluble) molecules cannot cross it easily. Once a non-charged molecule of a basic chemical crosses the cell membrane to enter the cell, it becomes charged due to gaining a hydrogen ion because of the lower pH inside the cell, and thus becomes unable to cross back. Because transmembrane equilibrium must be maintained, another unionized molecule must diffuse into the cell to repeat the process. Thus its concentration inside the cell increases many times that of the outside. The non-charged molecules of the drug remain in equal concentration on either side of the cell membrane.

The charge of a molecule depends upon the pH of its solution. In an acidic medium, basic drugs are more charged and acidic drugs are less charged. The converse is true in a basic medium. For example, Naproxen is a non-steroidal anti-inflammatory drug that is a weak acid (its pKa value is 5.0). The gastric juice has a pH of 2.0. It is a three-fold difference (due to log scale) between its pH and its pKa; therefore there is a 1000× difference between the charged and uncharged concentrations. So, in this case, for every one molecule of charged Naproxen, there are 1000 molecules of uncharged Naproxen at a pH of 2. This is why weak acids are better absorbed from the stomach and weak bases from intestine where the pH is alkaline. When pH of a solution is equal to pKa of dissolved drug, then 50% of the drug is ionized, another 50% is unionized. This is described by the Henderson-Hasselbalch equation.

== Pharmacology ==
In the kidneys, un-charged drugs can easily pass back into the bloodstream. However, charged drugs are more soluble in urine and cannot pass back, so they become trapped and are flushed out of the body

In medicine, doctors and pharmacists can intentionally change the pH of a patient's urine to treat drug overdoses using the principles of ion trapping:

- Making urine less acidic: Giving sodium bicarbonate raises urine pH. For acidic drugs like aspirin, this turns the drug into its ionized form. The charged drug gets trapped in the urine and leaves the body faster.
- Making urine more acidic: Lowering urine pH turns basic drugs into their ionized form, trapping them in the urine so they are removed from the body faster.

Ion trapping is also important outside of pharmacology. For example, it causes weakly acidic hormones to accumulate in the cytosol of cells. This is important in keeping the external concentration of the hormone low in the extracellular environment where many hormones are sensed. Examples of plant hormones that are subjected to ion trapping are abscisic acid, gibberellic acid and retinoic acid. Examples of animal hormones subjected to ion trapping include Prostacyclin and Leukotrienes.

== See also ==
- Osmosis
- Biophysics
- Forced diuresis
- Henderson–Hasselbalch equation
