= Alkalosis =

Increased blood pH

- Specialty: Endocrinology

Alkalosis is the result of a process reducing hydrogen ion concentration of arterial blood plasma (alkalemia). In contrast to acidemia (serum pH 7.35 or lower), alkalemia occurs when the serum pH is higher than normal (7.45 or higher). Alkalosis is usually divided into the categories of respiratory alkalosis and metabolic alkalosis or a combined respiratory/metabolic alkalosis.

== Signs and symptoms ==
Metabolic alkalosis is usually accompanied by low blood potassium concentration, causing, e.g., muscular weakness, muscle pain, and muscle cramps (from disturbed function of the skeletal muscles), and muscle spasms (from disturbed function of smooth muscles).

It may also cause low blood calcium concentration. As the blood pH increases, blood transport proteins, such as albumin, become more ionized into anions. This causes the free calcium present in blood to bind more strongly with albumin. It may cause tetany in severe cases.

== Causes ==
Respiratory alkalosis is caused by hyperventilation, resulting in a loss of carbon dioxide. Compensatory mechanisms for this include release of hydrogen ion from tissue buffers and excretion of bicarbonate in the kidneys, both of which lower blood pH. Hyperventilation-induced alkalosis can be seen in several deadly central nervous system diseases such as strokes or Rett syndrome.

In McArdle disease (glycogen storage disease type V), the inability to utilize muscle glycogen leads to a shortage of ATP during exercise and subsequent exercise-induced premature muscle fatigue, muscle cramps, muscle pain (myalgia), inappropriate rapid heart rate response to exercise (tachycardia), rapid depletion of phosphocreatine, insufficient ATP production, increased ADP and AMP, increased rise in venous ammonia (from the purine nucleotide cycle), increased epinephrine (adrenaline), increased plasma free fatty acids (lipolysis), increased venous pH (alkalosis), rapid (tachypnea) and commonly (approx. 50%) also heavy breathing (hyperpnea), that is exercise hyperventilation. During exercise, due to the inability to utilize muscle glycogen as a substrate for ATP synthesis, plasma lactate does not significantly rise (and may fall below) compared to resting levels; consequently, McArdle disease individuals do not experience lactic acidosis. The rise in venous pH (alkalosis), may be due to increased ammonia production, increased epinephrine, and/or increased oxygen demand for oxidative phosphorylation of blood borne substrates (free fatty acids and blood glucose).

Metabolic alkalosis can be caused by repeated vomiting, resulting in a loss of hydrochloric acid in the stomach contents. Severe dehydration, and the consumption of alkali, are other causes. It can also be caused by administration of diuretics and endocrine disorders such as Cushing's syndrome. Compensatory mechanism for metabolic alkalosis involve slowed breathing by the lungs to increase serum carbon dioxide, a condition leaning toward respiratory acidosis. As respiratory acidosis often accompanies the compensation for metabolic alkalosis, and vice versa, a delicate balance is created between these two conditions.

== See also ==
- Acidosis
- Acid–base imbalance
- Acid–base homeostasis
- Milk-alkali syndrome
- Arterial blood gas
- Chemical equilibrium
- pCO_{2}
- pH
- pK_{a}
