= Harvard Fatigue Laboratory =

Research centre in Boston, United States

Harvard Fatigue Laboratory (1927–1947) was a research centre designed to investigate the physiological, sociological and psychological impacts of fatigue caused by daily activities, and those on the conditions that industry workers faced at the time.

Founded in 1927, the laboratory was constructed in the basement of Morgan Hall at the Harvard Business School in Boston, part of Harvard University. The lab was described as a unique research facility that focused on a holistic approach to physiology, rather than systems- or organ-oriented. The laboratory was shut down in 1947 after the Second World War, as university policies halted the research facility from seeking government funds and the President of Harvard no longer saw its worth. The Fatigue Laboratory was seen as an instigator of exercise physiology as an academic discipline in part due to the legacy of the researchers that were once employed at the facility – forming and leading other exercise laboratories around the country after its closure. Its academic output also contributed to this legacy, with researchers publishing over 300 peer-reviewed research studies during its 20 years of operation.

Government funded projects during the Second World War realigned the laboratory's scientific endeavours from industry related research to research that involved the physiological environment soldiers faced at war. Clothing was tested to understand the heat distribution in the body to mitigate the impacts of 'trench-foot' and frostbite. Rations were also tested and recommendations of sufficient dietary requirements were sent to the army.

== Origins ==
Upon the inception of the Harvard Fatigue Laboratory, physiology at Harvard University was organised into four departments: applied physiology, comparative physiology, physical chemistry and physiology. In the USA, exercise physiology wasn't understood as an academic discipline until around the end of the Second World War. The laboratory therefore didn't belong to any department - investigating a broad range of physiological experiences that humans encounter in “everyday life”. Additionally, the prominent figures who contributed to its founding had academic backgrounds that were somewhat independent of what we now know as contemporary exercise physiology: Wallace Brett Donham (1877–1954), dean of Harvard's Business School; George Elton Mayo (1880–1949), psychologist and social theorist; and Lawrence J. Henderson (1878–1942), professor of biological chemistry at Harvard College.

Before its opening, L.J. Henderson was doing some research on the physiology of daily work, which Mayo was interested in academically. Mayo was discouraged by his current academic path, and wrote to Donham that there wasn't a “competent investigation of the physiological changes induced in the human organism by the conditions of . . . daily work” at his current organisation. Donham's interest in the human side of business operations led him to encourage Mayo to initiate the laboratory for study of the sociological and psychological impacts in the work place. Henderson and Mayo were pushed together by similar ideals on the nature of exercise physiology itself, as their approach was holistic rather than systems- or organ-oriented. Henderson had just moved from the Medical School to the Business School in 1926, and was in the process of reorganising his academic work from blood chemistry to human physiology. Henderson also involved a colleague from the Medical School, Arlie Bock, the clinical investigator at the Massachusetts General Hospital, and David Bruce Dill, who was a research fellow working with Bock at the time. Each individual added to the interdisciplinary culture of the laboratory, examining the broad nature of 'fatigue'. The interdisciplinary backgrounds of all the founding members meant that the laboratory focused on more than just ‘fatigue’ as a physiological phenomena – they also studied the psychological and sociological effects by which workers are subject to in the industry.

== Research ==
In the beginnings of the twentieth century, industrial workload and fatigue drew the attention of Western science to maximise the productivity of workers for economic prosperity. It is due to this research that centred heavily around the cultural and political contexts of the period that the facility is used as evidence to suggest the impact sociocultural environments has on dictating scientific progression.

The laboratory was named a ‘Fatigue laboratory’ in order to appeal to business leaders, engineers and the general public, whilst not constraining it to any departmental or narrow research activities due to the broad nature of the term 'fatigue'. In its 20 years of operation, 16 publications pertaining to fatigue were produced, whereas most others included hematology, comparative physiology, altitude physiology and temperature physiology.

Of the 300 peer-reviewed research studies originating from the laboratory, topics ranged from the general; work capacity and fatigue, to the more specific; cardiovascular and haemodynamic responses to exercise. This was a direct result of Henderson and Mayo's holistic approach to physiology as opposed to a systems- or organ-oriented approach, which was novel in their time.

The Fatigue Laboratory was celebrated for its culture surrounding self-experimentation – the researchers would includes themselves as subjects and partake in the experiments. A prime example of this is Dill and his colleague, John Talbott, went to the Hoover Dam not long after its construction to investigate the working conditions of the employees. Workers at the dam were subject to extreme heat that led to exhaustion and death. Dill and Talbott went to the Hoover Dam with healthy work crew volunteers and ran physiological and biochemical studies on themselves and the subjects to investigate. As a result, Dill and Talbott concluded that cooler conditions to sleep and a salt-heavy diet would mitigate impacts of heat and exhaustion.

Some of the laboratory's work centred around the development of biochemical methods to study the blood of exercising individuals. They carried out experiments on Olympian marathon runner Clarence De Mar from 1927 to 1932 and discovered that an individual could achieve a physiological steady state, whereby the blood was at chemical equilibrium even during strenuous exercise. This was taken as physiological evidence that fatigue was more psychological than physiological. It was later theorised by a scientist outside the laboratory, Walter Bradford Cannon, that the tendency of the human body was to move towards a steady-state – homeostasis – and fatigue research grew in its complexity.

The laboratory's contribution to scientific literature extended further than just publications that originated from its field work. Funding bodies of the Harvard Fatigue Laboratory, like the Committee for Industrial Physiology, provided financial support for a diverse research of human biology. The most notable of which is the study of the “Hawthorne effect” by George Elton Mayo, where subjects alter their behaviour as a response to being observed – a study that is noted as having the potential to have never been achieved if not for the funding and support of the CIP and the Harvard Fatigue Laboratory.

The Fatigue Laboratory's commitment to standards and norms set by institutions of similar prestige was important in its relevance to scientific literature at the time. The lab placed an emphasis on proper calibration of instruments, protocol and standardisation of systemic management duties to set a foundation to all scientific work. This validated the lab's work to prestigious institutions and helped set its scientific relevance to contemporary exercise physiology.

=== Second World War ===
During the Second World War, the Harvard Fatigue Laboratory was used as one of the research facilities to examine conditions faced by soldiers. Diets of soldiers were copied and analysed under similar environmental conditions, and new emergency rations to be sent to soldiers were tested for efficacy. The laboratory also contained extreme temperature rooms to investigate the physiological effects of different climates on soldier performance. A primary purpose of this was to understand the energy metabolism and heat flow from human subjects due to clothing – to optimise weight carried and energy output.

The laboratory was also commissioned to examine the heat distribution of pilots flying at high altitudes. Electrically heated suits that were developed by Harwood Belding were tested by the Harvard Fatigue Laboratory to discover the optimal distribution of heat over the soldiers body to ensure maximal soldier performance. These findings were then sent to General Electric for the production and manufacturing of the suits which the soldiers used. Another use of the laboratory was to study the physiological impacts of suddenly breathing air with low levels of oxygen to replicate the physiological environment that pilots in the air force were subjected to.

Study of the onset and progression of frostbite in tissues and ‘trench-foot’ were conducted to determine the adequate clothing required for servicemen and women. The laboratory mainly focused on the impact ambient temperatures can have in the slow death of foot tissue. One study showed that the standard leather military boot was not sufficient for cold weather service as they were not impermeable to wet grounds and also did not permit an extra layer of socks for heat control. The laboratory tested a new shoe, the L.L Bean shoepac, a sturdier boot with rubber soles and sides and room for more socks. They concluded it had greater last and better heat retention, so recommended it to the army for use in service.

The Fatigue Laboratory and its staff were not limited to studies involving human subjects. An investigation into the use of bats as vectors of incendiary devices was studied by a researcher at the Harvard Fatigue Laboratory; as intel discovered that Japanese civilians would use straw in the roofs of their houses.

== Contributions to exercise physiology ==
The Harvard Fatigue Laboratory is one of the many institutions responsible for the organisation of exercise physiology as a legitimate academic discipline. 20% of the Academic material produced by the laboratory was specifically related to exercise physiology, and another 41% was associated with exercise in some way.

The formation of an academic discipline is outlined by Tipton (1998), and includes the argument that formal courses and PhD research must be undertaken in the field in order for the discipline to separate itself from others. Due to the structure of the Harvard fatigue laboratory, PhD students weren't able to complete research there, so this was described as an impediment to the progression of exercise physiology as a discipline. As no formal courses in exercise physiology were offered to undergraduates from the laboratory, the formation of the academic discipline was left to other institutions. However, the legacy of the Harvard Fatigue Laboratory as a facility that published an enormous amount of literature surrounding the topics of exercise and exercise physiology is one of the compounding factors that started the discipline. When the laboratory was closed in 1947, the researchers who gained experience under Henderson and Dill were employed in other institutions more equipped to propel exercise physiology as a discipline. The laboratory is noted as stimulating the birth of exercise physiology as a result of the staff forming and leading exercise laboratory's all over the nation.

== Closure ==
In 1947, by the decree of the President of Harvard University, James B. Conant closed the Harvard Fatigue Laboratory. Conant wrote to the Dean of the Business school stating that either he finance the Fatigue Laboratory himself, or close it – sources at the time believed that Conant did not think it could have any functional use after the War, so didn't support it. Their model to understand ‘Fatigue’ as an industrial solution to productivity was not thoroughly understood, and it looked as though fatigue was more complex than originally thought. On top of this, the mechanisation of industrial work alleviated the stress and fatigue workers faced during the period. Conant saw this as a reason to disband the scientific progression of the laboratory.

A multitude of compounding factors also played into the closing of the laboratory. The death of L.J. Henderson in 1942 saw Dill take the role of the director, the post-war Harvard University policy that the facility should not seek government funds, the dispersion of staff to other laboratories and sites because of WWII, the belief of Conant that the laboratory should reduce its sociological activities and the lack of harmony between the Medical School dean and the dean that replaced Donham.
