= Henderson–Hasselbalch equation =

Equation used to estimate pH of a weak acid or base solution

In chemistry and biochemistry, the pH of weakly acidic chemical solutions can be estimated using the Henderson–Hasselbalch equation:
$$\ce{pH} = \ce{p}K_\ce{a} + \log_{10}  \left( \frac{[\ce{Base}]}{[\ce{Acid}]} \right)$$

The equation relates the pH of a weak acid - weak base buffer solution to the numerical value of the acid dissociation constant, K_{a}, of the acid, and the ratio of the concentrations of the acid and its conjugate base.

Acid-base equilibrium reaction

$$\mathrm{\underset {(acid)} {HA} \rightleftharpoons \underset {(base)} {A^-} + H^+}$$

The Henderson–Hasselbalch equation is often used for estimating the pH of buffer solutions by approximating the actual concentration ratio as the ratio of the analytical concentrations of the acid and of a salt, MA. It is also useful for determining the volumes of the reagents needed before preparing buffer solutions, which prevents unnecessary waste of chemical reagents that may need to be further neutralized by even more reagents before they are safe to expose.

For example, the acid may be carbonic acid

$$\ce{CO2} + \ce{H2O} \rightleftharpoons \ce{H2CO3} \rightleftharpoons \ce{HCO3-} + \mathrm{H^+}$$

The equation can also be applied to bases by specifying the protonated form of the base as the acid. For example, with an amine, $\mathrm{RNH_2}$

$$\mathrm{RNH_3^+ \rightleftharpoons RNH_2 + H^+}$$

The Henderson–Hasselbalch buffer system also has many natural and biological applications, from physiological processes (e.g., metabolic acidosis) to geological phenomena.

== History ==
The Henderson–Hasselbalch equation was developed by Lawrence Joseph Henderson and Karl Albert Hasselbalch. Henderson was a biological chemist and Hasselbalch was a physiologist who studied pH.

In 1908, Henderson derived an equation to calculate the hydrogen ion concentration of a bicarbonate buffer solution, which rearranged looks like this:

[H^{+}] [HCO_{3}^{–}] = K [CO_{2}] [H_{2}O]

In 1909, Sørensen introduced the pH terminology, which allowed Hasselbalch to re-express Henderson's equation in logarithmic terms, resulting in the Henderson–Hasselbalch equation.

== Assumptions, limitations, and derivation ==
A simple buffer solution consists of a solution of an acid and a salt of the conjugate base of the acid. For example, the acid may be acetic acid and the salt may be sodium acetate. The Henderson–Hasselbalch equation relates the pH of a solution containing a mixture of the two components to the acid dissociation constant, K_{a} of the acid, and the concentrations of the species in solution.

Simulated titration of an acidified solution of a weak acid (pK_{a} = 4.7) with alkali

To derive the equation a number of simplifying assumptions have to be made.

Assumption 1: The acid, HA, is monobasic and dissociates according to the equations

$$\ce{HA <=> H^+ + A^-}$$
$$\mathrm{C_A = [A^-] + [H^+][A^-]/K_a}$$
$$\mathrm{C_H = [H^+] + [H^+][A^-]/K_a}$$

C_{A} is the analytical concentration of the acid and C_{H} is the concentration the hydrogen ion that has been added to the solution. The self-dissociation of water is ignored. A quantity in square brackets, [X], represents the concentration of the chemical substance X. It is understood that the symbol H^{+} stands for the hydrated hydronium ion. K_{a} is an acid dissociation constant.

The Henderson–Hasselbalch equation can be applied to a polybasic acid only if its consecutive pK values differ by at least 3. Phosphoric acid is such an acid.

Assumption 2. The self-ionization of water can be ignored. This assumption is not, strictly speaking, valid with pH values close to 7, half the value of pK_{w}, the constant for self-ionization of water. In this case the mass-balance equation for hydrogen should be extended to take account of the self-ionization of water.

$$\mathrm{C_H = [H^+] + [H^+][A^-]/K_a + K_w/[H^+]}$$

However, the term $\mathrm{K_w/[H^+]}$ can be omitted to a good approximation.

Assumption 3: The salt MA is completely dissociated in solution. For example, with sodium acetate

$$\mathrm{Na(CH_3CO_2) \rightarrow Na^ + + CH_3CO_2^-}$$

the concentration of the undissociated salt on the right-hand side of the equation can be ignored. This is a good approximation for highly soluble salts, and we can simply assume that the initial concentration of conjugate base added to the solution is the concentration of its salt added to the solution.

Assumption 4: The quotient of activity coefficients, $\Gamma$, is a constant under the experimental conditions covered by the calculations.

The thermodynamic equilibrium constant, $K^*$,

$$K^* = \frac{ [\ce{H+}][\ce{A^-}]} { [\ce{HA}] } \times \frac{ \gamma_{\ce{H+}} \gamma _{\ce{A^-}}} {\gamma _{HA} }$$

is a product of a quotient of concentrations $\frac{ [\ce{H+}][\ce{A^-}]} { [\ce{HA}] }$ and a quotient, $\Gamma$, of activity coefficients $\frac{ \gamma_{\ce{H+}} \gamma _{\ce{A^-}}} {\gamma _{HA} }$. In these expressions, the quantities in square brackets signify the concentration of the undissociated acid, HA, of the hydrogen ion H^{+}, and of the anion A^{−}; the quantities $\gamma$ are the corresponding activity coefficients. If the quotient of activity coefficients can be assumed to be a constant which is independent of concentrations and pH, the dissociation constant, K_{a} can be expressed as a quotient of concentrations.

$$K_a = \frac{K^*}{\Gamma} = \frac{[\ce{H+}][\ce{A^-}]}{[\ce{HA}]}$$

=== Derivation ===
Following these assumptions, the Henderson–Hasselbalch equation is derived in a few logarithmic steps.
$$K_a = {[H^{+}][A^{-}] \over [HA] }$$

Solve for $[H^{+}]$:
$$[H^{+}] = K_a {[HA] \over [A^{-}] }$$

On both sides, take the negative logarithm:
$$-\log [H^{+}] = -\log K_a -\log {[HA] \over [A^{-}] }$$

Based on previous assumptions, $pH = - \log[H^{+}]$ and $pK_a = -\log K_a$
$$pH = pK_a -\log {[HA] \over [A^{-}] }$$

Inversion of $-\log {[HA] \over [A^{-}] }$ by changing its sign, provides the Henderson–Hasselbalch equation
$$pH = pK_a + \log {[A^{-}] \over [HA] }$$

== Application to bases ==
The equilibrium constant for the protonation of a base, B,

+ H^{+} ⇌

is an association constant, K_{b}, which is simply related to the dissociation constant of the conjugate acid, BH^{+}.

$$\mathrm{pK_a  = \mathrm{pK_w} - \mathrm{pK_b}}$$

The value of $\mathrm{pK_w}$ is ca. 14 at 25 °C. This approximation can be used when the correct value is not known. Thus, the Henderson–Hasselbalch equation can be used, without modification, for bases.

== Biological applications ==
With homeostasis the pH of a biological solution is maintained at a constant value by adjusting the position of the equilibria

$$\ce{HCO3-} + \mathrm{H^+} \rightleftharpoons \ce{H2CO3} \rightleftharpoons \ce{CO2} + \ce{H2O}$$

where $\mathrm{HCO_3^-}$ is the bicarbonate ion and $\mathrm{H_2CO_3}$ is carbonic acid. Carbonic acid is formed reversibly from carbon dioxide and water. However, the solubility of carbonic acid in water may be exceeded. When this happens carbon dioxide gas is liberated and the following equation may be used instead.

$$\mathrm{[H^+] [HCO_3^-]} = \mathrm{K^m [CO_2(g)]}$$

$\mathrm{CO_2(g)}$ represents the carbon dioxide liberated as gas. In this equation, which is widely used in biochemistry, $K^m$ is a mixed equilibrium constant relating to both chemical and solubility equilibria. It can be expressed as

$$\mathrm{pH} = 6.1 + \log_{10}  \left ( \frac{[\mathrm{HCO}_3^-]}{0.0307 \times P_{\mathrm{CO}_2}} \right )$$

where [HCO^{−}_{3}] is the molar concentration (in mmol/L) of bicarbonate in blood plasma and P_{CO_{2}} is the partial pressure (in mmHg) of carbon dioxide in blood plasma (see Henry's law). The concentration of $\mathrm{H_2CO_3}$ is dependent on the $[\mathrm{CO_2(aq)}]$which is also dependent on P_{CO_{2}}.

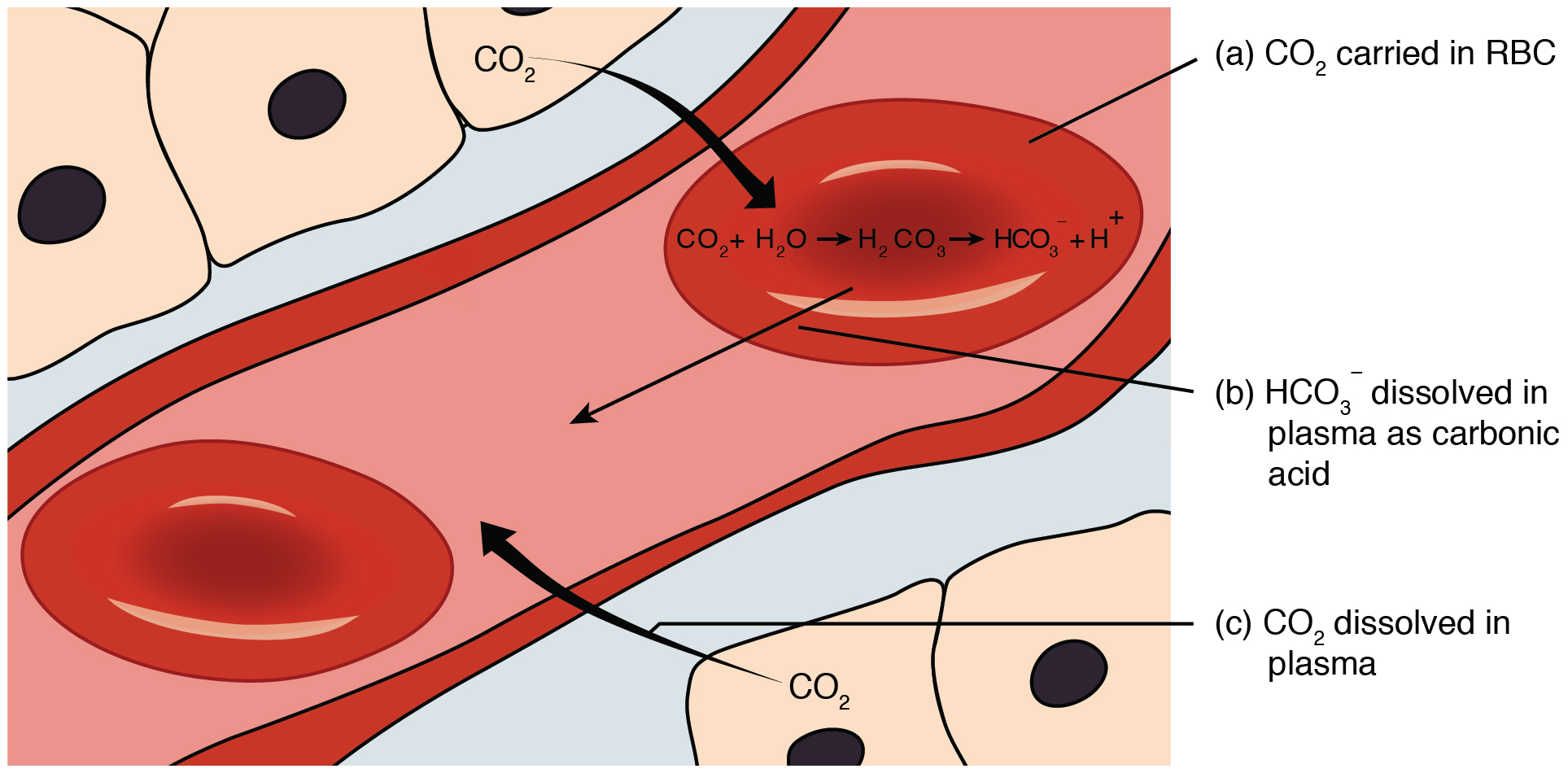
Carbon dioxide, a by-product of cellular respiration, is dissolved in the blood. From the blood it is taken up by red blood cells and converted to carbonic acid by the carbonate buffer system. Most carbonic acid then dissociates to bicarbonate and hydrogen ions.

One of the buffer systems present in the body is the blood plasma buffering system. This is formed from $\mathrm{H_2CO_3}$, carbonic acid, working in conjunction with [HCO^{−}_{3}], bicarbonate, to form the bicarbonate system. This is effective near physiological pH of 7.4 as carboxylic acid is in equilibrium with $\mathrm{CO_2(g)}$ in the lungs. As blood travels through the body, it gains and loses H+ from different processes including lactic acid fermentation and by NH3 protonation from protein catabolism. Because of this the $[\mathrm{H_2CO_3}]$, changes in the blood as it passes through tissues. This correlates to a change in the partial pressure of $\mathrm{CO_2(g)}$ in the lungs causing a change in the rate of respiration if more or less $\mathrm{CO_2(g)}$ is necessary. For example, a decreased blood pH will trigger the brain stem to perform more frequent respiration. The Henderson–Hasselbalch equation can be used to model these equilibria. It is important to maintain this pH of 7.4 to ensure enzymes are able to work optimally.

Life threatening Acidosis (a low blood pH resulting in nausea, headaches, and even coma, and convulsions) is due to a lack of functioning of enzymes at a low pH. As modelled by the Henderson–Hasselbalch equation, in severe cases this can be reversed by administering intravenous bicarbonate solution. If the partial pressure of $\mathrm{CO_2(g)}$ does not change, this addition of bicarbonate solution will raise the blood pH.

== Natural buffers ==
The ocean contains a natural buffer system to maintain a pH between 8.1 and 8.3. The ocean buffer system is known as the carbonate buffer system. The carbonate buffer system is a series of reactions that uses carbonate as a buffer to convert $\mathrm{CO_2}$ into bicarbonate. The carbonate buffer reaction helps maintain a constant H^{+} concentration in the ocean because it consumes hydrogen ions, and thereby maintains a constant pH. The ocean has been experiencing ocean acidification due to humans' increasing $\mathrm{CO_2}$ in the atmosphere. About 30% of the $\mathrm{CO_2}$ that is released in the atmosphere is absorbed by the ocean, and the increase in $\mathrm{CO_2}$ absorption results in an increase in H^{+} ion production. The increase in atmospheric $\mathrm{CO_2}$ increases H^{+} ion production because in the ocean $\mathrm{CO_2}$ reacts with water and produces carbonic acid, and carbonic acid releases H^{+} ions and bicarbonate ions. Overall, since the Industrial Revolution the ocean has experienced a pH decrease of about 0.1 pH units due to the increase in $\mathrm{CO_2}$ production.

Ocean acidification affects marine life that have shells that are made up of carbonate. In a more acidic environment, it is harder for organisms to grow and maintain the carbonate shells. The increase in ocean acidity can cause carbonate shell organisms to experience reduced growth and reproduction.

== Pharmacological applications ==
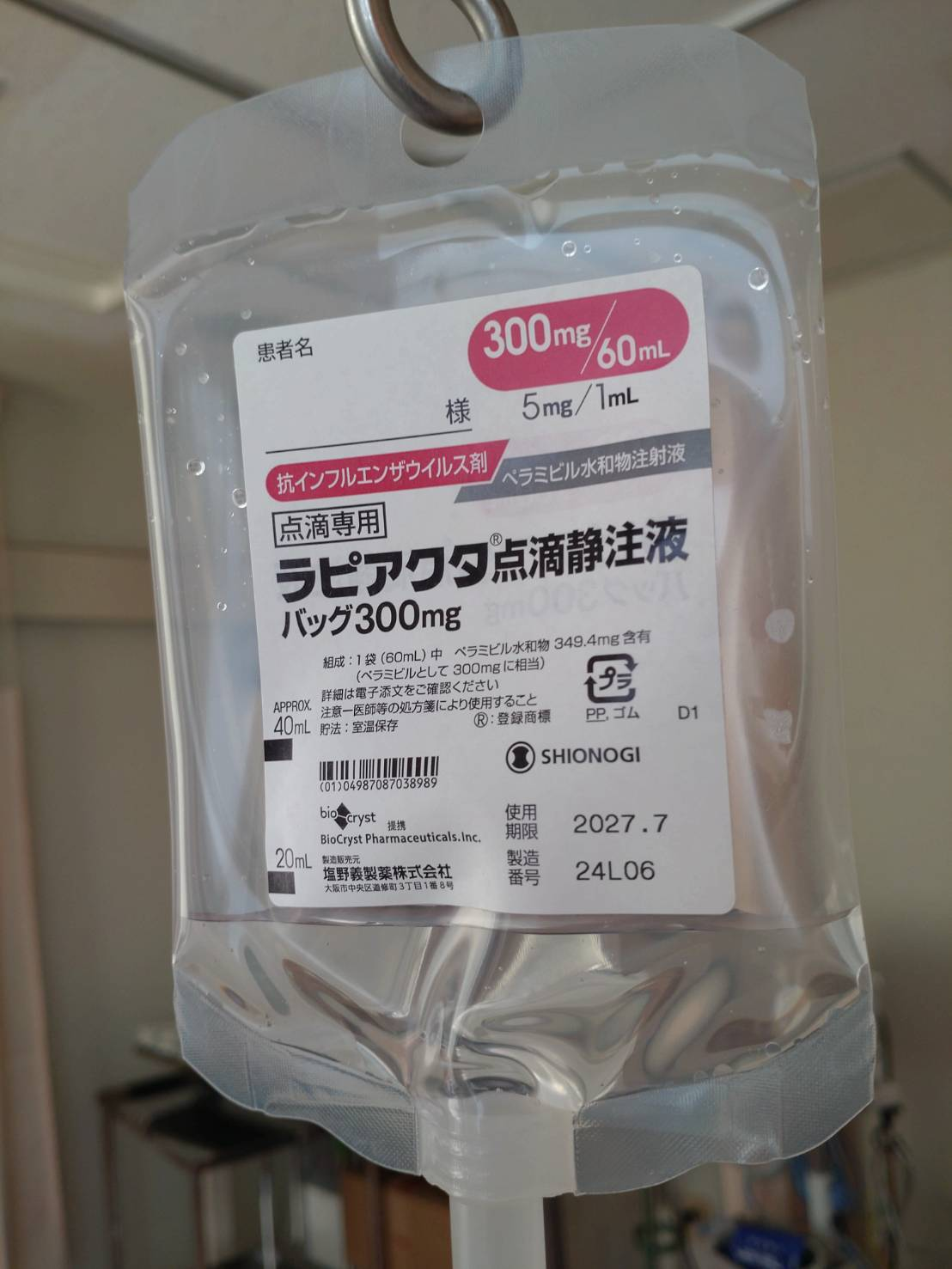
An intravenous solution bag. Drugs usually needs to behydrophilic to remain dissolved in solution

The Henderson–Hasselbalch equation is widely used in pharmacology and medicinal chemistry to predict drug behavior in biological systems and to assist in drug design. By comparing a drug molecule's acid dissociation constant ($pK_a$) with the environmental $pH$ of biological fluids, the equation determines the ratio between its ionized (charged) and un-ionized (neutral) species. This ratio dictates key pharmacokinetics properties, including solubility, membrane permeability, gastrointestinal absorption, and kidney elimination.

=== Solubility ===
The degree of ionization directly influences drug's solubility. In general terms, ionized molecules are polar and therefore hydrophilic (soluble in water), whereas un-ionized molecules are nonpolar and lipophilic (nonsoluble in water, soluble in lipids). Using the Henderson–Hasselbalch equation, it is possible to determine the pH range required to keep a drug dissolved for liquid formulations (such as intravenous injections or cough syrups) or to predict its dissolution rate in the digestive tract. Acidic drugs (lower $pK_a$) usually remains un-ionized in the stomach (lower $pH$), whereas basic drugs are ionized in the stomach pH.

=== Absorption ===
Detailed representation of a cell membrane, featuring its lipid bilayer.

Because cell membranes are made of a lipid bilayer, drugs usually need to be in their uncharged (non-ionized) form to pass through them into the bloodstream. The pH levels vary throughout the digestive system, from highly acidic in the stomach (pH 1.5–3.5) to nearly neutral in the small intestine (pH 6.0–7.5).

- Acidic drugs (such as aspirin) remain largely uncharged in the acidic stomach. This helps them pass directly through stomach cells into the blood.
- Basic drugs (such as amphetamine) become largely ionised in the stomach, so they are poorly absorbed there. Once they reach the small intestine, the higher pH converts more of the drug to its uncharged form, allowing it to be absorbed.

Even though stomach acid helps weak acids pass through stomach cells, the majority of all drugs are absorbed in the small intestine because it has a much larger surface area.

=== Elimination ===
The equation also explains how changing the pH of urine affects how fast drugs are removed from the body by the kidneys, a process called ion trapping. In the kidneys, uncharged drugs can easily pass back into the bloodstream. However, charged drugs are more soluble in urine and cannot pass back, so they become trapped in the urine and are flushed out of the body

In medicine, doctors and pharmacists can intentionally change the pH of a patient's urine to treat drug overdoses:

- Making urine less acidic: Giving sodium bicarbonate raises urine pH. For acidic drugs like aspirin, this turns the drug into its charged form. The charged drug gets trapped in the urine and leaves the body faster.
- Making urine more acidic: Lowering urine pH turns basic drugs into their charged form, trapping them in the urine so they are removed from the body faster.

== See also ==
- Davenport diagram
- Gastric tonometry
- Bjerrum plot (or Sillén diagram)
