= Sporolides =

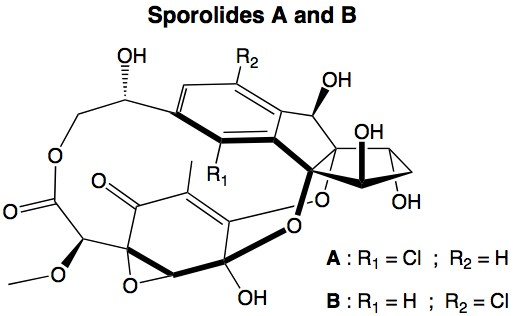

Names
- IUPAC name (3S,7S,8R,12R,17R,19R,21R,25R)-23-chloro-3,12,17,19,21-pentahydroxy-8-methoxy-5-methyl-2,10,24,26-tetraoxaheptacyclo[11.8.2.2^{7,7}.1^{4,18}.0^{1,18}.0^{16,22}.0^{3,25}]hexacosa-4,13(23),14,16(22)-tetraene-6,9-dione

Identifiers
3D model (JSmol)	A: Interactive image; B: Interactive image
ChEBI	A: CHEBI:219763; B: CHEBI:204081
ChemSpider	A: 10480740; B: 28286215
PubChem CID	A: 102352691; B: 76900362
- InChI: A: InChI=1S/C24H23ClO12/c1-7-15(29)21-18(33-2)19(31)34-6-10(26)8-3-4-9-13(14(8)25)22-11(27)5-12(28)23(22,16(9)30)35-17(7)24(32,37-22)20(21)36-21/h3-4,10-12,16,18,20,26-28,30,32H,5-6H2,1-2H3/t10-,11+,12+,16+,18-,20+,21+,22?,23?,24+/m0/s1 Key: KFIMJAYNUYNRLK-PKIZEOIBSA-N; B: InChI=1S/C24H23ClO12/c1-7-15(29)21-18(33-2)19(31)34-6-11(26)8-3-9-14(10(25)4-8)16(30)23-13(28)5-12(27)22(9,23)37-24(32,17(7)35-23)20(21)36-21/h3-4,11-13,16,18,20,26-28,30,32H,5-6H2,1-2H3/t11-,12+,13+,16+,18-,20+,21-,22-,23-,24+/m0/s1 Key: CYXHIOKLZVVCBQ-LCCPHMJJSA-N
- SMILES: A: CC1=C2[C@@]3([C@H]4[C@](C1=O)(O4)[C@H](C(=O)OC[C@@H](C5=C(C6=C(C=C5)[C@H](C7(C6(O3)[C@@H](C[C@H]7O)O)O2)O)Cl)O)OC)O; B: CC1=C2C3(C4C(C1=O)(O4)C(C(=O)OCC(C5=CC6=C(C(C7(C6(O3)C(CC7O)O)O2)O)C(=C5)Cl)O)OC)O

Properties
Chemical formula	C_{24}H_{23}ClO_{12}
Molar mass	538.89 g·mol^{−1}
- Except where otherwise noted, data are given for materials in their standard state (at 25 °C [77 °F], 100 kPa). Infobox references

Sporolides A and B are polycyclic macrolides extracted from the obligate marine bacterium Salinispora tropica, which is found in ocean sediment. They are composed of a chlorinated cyclopenta[a]indene ring and a cyclohexenone moiety. They were the second group of compounds (after salinosporamide A) isolated from Salinispora, and were said to indicate the potential of marine actinomycetes as a source of novel secondary metabolites. The structures and absolute stereochemistries of both metabolites were elucidated using a combination of NMR spectroscopy and X-ray crystallography.

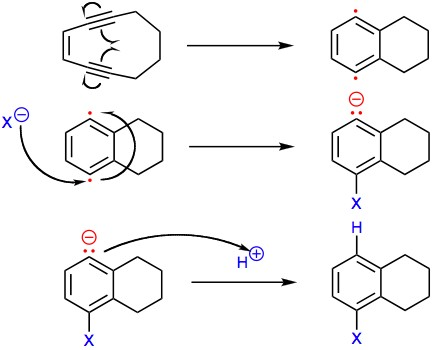
The complex aromatic structure of the sporolides was hypothesized to be derived from an unstable nine-membered ring enediyne precursor, which could undergo Bergman cyclization to generate a para-benzyne intermediate. Nucleophilic attack by chloride would account for the 1:1 mixture of sporolide A and B and for the single chlorine in these enediyne-derived natural products. This proposed mechanism was demonstrated in laboratory experiments,

== Biosynthesis ==
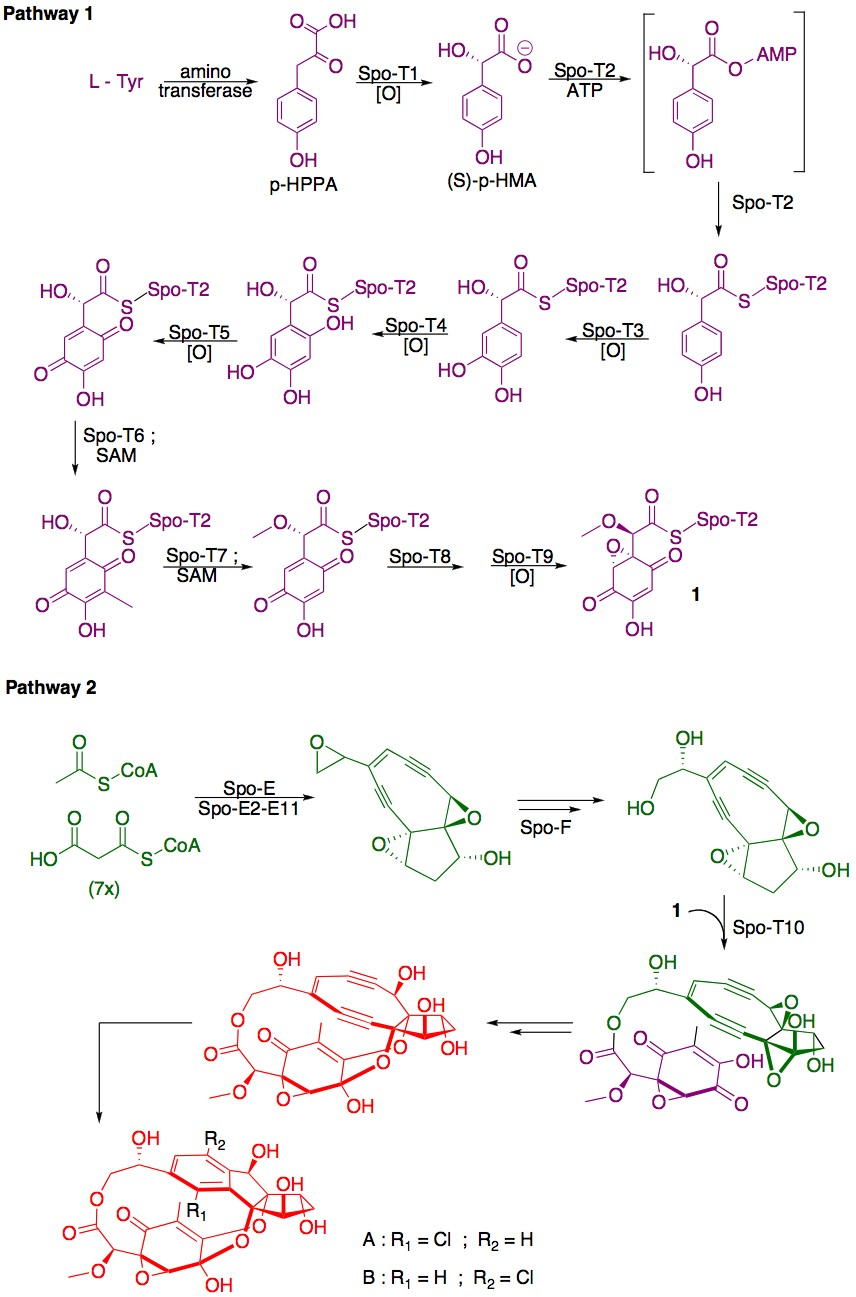
The biosynthesis of sporolide A and B is related to that of enediynes such as dynemicin A and is proposed to proceed as shown below.

== Chemical synthesis ==
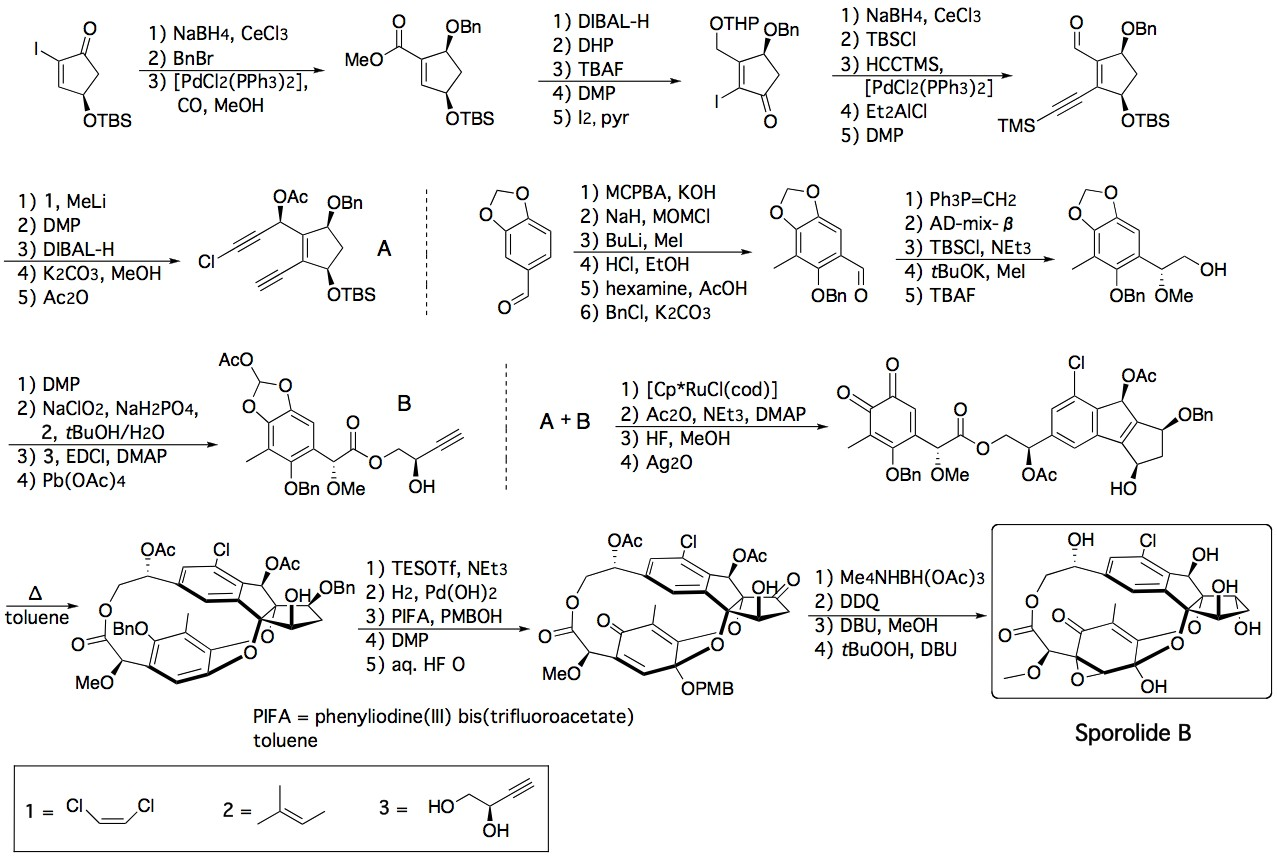
The first total synthesis of sporolide B was reported by K. C. Nicolaou's group and used a highly stereoselective and convergent strategy that involved two cycloaddition reactions. The first was a ruthenium-catalyzed intermolecular [2+2+2] cycloaddition reaction between two acetylenic units, A and B, and the second a thermally induced intramolecular [4+2] cycloaddition reaction between an o-quinone and the tetrasubstituted olefin within the intermediate, forming the macrocyclic structure of the target product.
