= Micromonospora ureilytica =

Scientific classification
- Domain: Bacteria
- Kingdom: Bacillati
- Phylum: Actinomycetota
- Class: Actinomycetia
- Order: Micromonosporales
- Family: Micromonosporaceae
- Genus: Micromonospora
- Species: M. ureilytica

Binomial name
- Micromonospora ureilytica Carro et al. 2016

Type strain
- CECT 9022; DSM 101692; GUI23

Species of bacterium

Micromonospora ureilytica is a bacterium from the genus Micromonospora which has been isolated from nodules from the plant Pisum sativum in Canizal, Spain.
