= Micromonospora noduli =

Scientific classification
- Domain: Bacteria
- Kingdom: Bacillati
- Phylum: Actinomycetota
- Class: Actinomycetia
- Order: Micromonosporales
- Family: Micromonosporaceae
- Genus: Micromonospora
- Species: M. noduli

Binomial name
- Micromonospora noduli Carro et al. 2016

Type strain
- CECT 9020; DSM 101694; GUI43

Species of bacterium

Micromonospora noduli is a bacterium from the genus Micromonospora which has been isolated from the nodules from the plant Pisum sativum in Cañizal, Spain.
