= Micromonospora luteifusca =

Scientific classification
- Domain: Bacteria
- Kingdom: Bacillati
- Phylum: Actinomycetota
- Class: Actinomycetia
- Order: Micromonosporales
- Family: Micromonosporaceae
- Genus: Micromonospora
- Species: M. luteifusca

Binomial name
- Micromonospora luteifusca Carro et al. 2017

Type strain
- CECT 8846; DSM 100204; CR21; GUI2; GUI42

Species of bacterium

Micromonospora luteifusca is a bacterium from the genus Micromonospora which has been isolated from the nodules of the plant Pisum sativum in Cañizal, Spain.
