= Micromonospora costi =

Scientific classification
- Domain: Bacteria
- Kingdom: Bacillati
- Phylum: Actinomycetota
- Class: Actinomycetia
- Order: Micromonosporales
- Family: Micromonosporaceae
- Genus: Micromonospora
- Species: M. costi

Binomial name
- Micromonospora costi Thawai 2015

Type strain
- BCC 58124; CS1-12; NBRC 109518

Species of bacterium

Micromonospora costi is a spore-forming bacterium from the genus Micromonospora which has been isolated from leaves of the plant Costus speciosus.
