= Micromonospora vulcania =

Scientific classification
- Domain: Bacteria
- Kingdom: Bacillati
- Phylum: Actinomycetota
- Class: Actinomycetia
- Order: Micromonosporales
- Family: Micromonosporaceae
- Genus: Micromonospora
- Species: M. vulcania

Binomial name
- Micromonospora vulcania Jia et al. 2016

Type strain
- CGMCC 4.7144; DSM 46711; NEAU-JM2

Species of bacterium

Micromonospora vulcania is a bacterium from the genus Micromonospora which has been isolated from volcanic sediments in Tonghua, China.
