= Micromonospora echinofusca =

Scientific classification
- Domain: Bacteria
- Kingdom: Bacillati
- Phylum: Actinomycetota
- Class: Actinomycetia
- Order: Micromonosporales
- Family: Micromonosporaceae
- Genus: Micromonospora
- Species: M. echinofusca

Binomial name
- Micromonospora echinofusca Kroppenstedt et al. 2005

Type strain
- DSM 43913; IFO 14267; JCM 3327; NBRC 14267

Species of bacterium

Micromonospora echinofusca is an endophytic actinomycete.
