= Dactylosporangium aurantiacum =

Scientific classification
- Domain: Bacteria
- Kingdom: Bacillati
- Phylum: Actinomycetota
- Class: Actinomycetes
- Order: Micromonosporales
- Family: Micromonosporaceae
- Genus: Dactylosporangium
- Species: D. aurantiacum

Binomial name
- Dactylosporangium aurantiacum Thiemann et al. 1967 (Approved Lists 1980)

Type strain
- ATCC 23491; DSM 43157; IFO 12592; JCM 3083; NBRC 12592; NRRL B-8018; NRRL B-8111; VKM Ac-654

Species of bacterium

Dactylosporangium aurantiacum is a Gram-positive soil-based actinobacterium in the family Micromonosporaceae. Like all Dactylosporangium species, aurantiacum is aerobic and mesophilic.

One subspecies, hamdenesis, produces a number of 18-membered macrolide antibiotics called tiacumicins as a byproduct of fermentation. One of these, tiacumicin B, commonly known as fidaxomicin, has narrow-spectrum bacteriocidal action against Gram-positive anaerobic bacteria, including Clostridioides difficile.
