= Micromonospora trujilloniae =

Scientific classification
- Domain: Bacteria
- Kingdom: Bacillati
- Phylum: Actinomycetota
- Class: Actinomycetia
- Order: Micromonosporales
- Family: Micromonosporaceae
- Genus: Micromonospora
- Species: M. trujilloniae

Binomial name
- Micromonospora trujilloniae Nouioui et al. 2018

Type strain
- 234402; CCTCC AA 2011018; DSM 45674

Synonyms
- Verrucosispora wenchangensis Xie et al. 2012

Species of bacterium

Micromonospora trujilloniae is a Gram-positive bacterium from the genus Micromonospora which has been isolated from mangrove soil in Wenchang, Hainan, China.
