= Micromonospora mangrovi =

Scientific classification
- Domain: Bacteria
- Kingdom: Bacillati
- Phylum: Actinomycetota
- Class: Actinomycetia
- Order: Micromonosporales
- Family: Micromonosporaceae
- Genus: Micromonospora
- Species: M. mangrovi

Binomial name
- Micromonospora mangrovi Xie et al. 2016

Type strain
- CCTCC AA 2012012; DSM 45761; 2803GPT1-18

Species of bacterium

Micromonospora mangrovi is a bacterium from the genus Micromonospora which has been isolated from mangrove soil in Beihai in China.
