= Micromonospora sagamiensis =

Scientific classification
- Domain: Bacteria
- Kingdom: Bacillati
- Phylum: Actinomycetota
- Class: Actinomycetia
- Order: Micromonosporales
- Family: Micromonosporaceae
- Genus: Micromonospora
- Species: M. sagamiensis

Binomial name
- Micromonospora sagamiensis Kroppenstedt et al. 2005

Type strain
- ATCC 21826; DSM 43912; JCM 3310; NBRC 101888; NRRL 11334

Species of bacterium

Micromonospora sagamiensis is an endophytic actinomycete. It produces sagamicin, an aminoglycoside antibiotic, as well as several mutational variants. Its cell wall contains only D-alanine.
