= Micromonospora nickelidurans =

Scientific classification
- Domain: Bacteria
- Kingdom: Bacillati
- Phylum: Actinomycetota
- Class: Actinomycetia
- Order: Micromonosporales
- Family: Micromonosporaceae
- Genus: Micromonospora
- Species: M. nickelidurans

Binomial name
- Micromonospora nickelidurans Lin et al. 2015

Type strain
- ACCC 19713; JCM 30559; K55

Species of bacterium

Micromonospora nickelidurans is a bacterium from the genus Micromonospora which has been isolated from soil from a nickel mine in Yueyang, China.
