= Cadazolid =

Chemical compound

Clinical data
- ATC code: none

Legal status
- Legal status: Investigational

Identifiers
- IUPAC name: 1-Cyclopropyl-6-fluoro-7-[4-({2-fluoro-4-[(5R)-5-(hydroxymethyl)-2-oxo-1,3-oxazolidin-3-yl]phenoxy}methyl)-4-hydroxypiperidin-1-yl]-4-oxo-1,4-dihydroquinolin-3-carboxylic acid
- CAS Number: 1025097-10-2
- ChemSpider: 30774277
- UNII: 2OEA2UN10Y
- KEGG: D11207
- CompTox Dashboard (EPA): DTXSID10145234

Chemical and physical data
- Formula: C_{29}H_{29}F_{2}N_{3}O_{8}
- Molar mass: 585.561 g·mol^{−1}
- 3D model (JSmol): Interactive image
- SMILES: OC(C1=CN(C2CC2)C3=C(C=C(F)C(N4CCC(COC5=C(F)C=C(N6C[C@H](CO)OC6=O)C=C5)(O)CC4)=C3)C1=O)=O
- InChI: InChI=1S/C29H29F2N3O8/c30-21-10-19-23(33(16-1-2-16)13-20(26(19)36)27(37)38)11-24(21)32-7-5-29(40,6-8-32)15-41-25-4-3-17(9-22(25)31)34-12-18(14-35)42-28(34)39/h3-4,9-11,13,16,18,35,40H,1-2,5-8,12,14-15H2,(H,37,38)/t18-/m1/s1; Key:XWFCFMXQTBGXQW-GOSISDBHSA-N

Cadazolid is an experimental antibiotic of the oxazolidinone class made by Actelion Pharmaceuticals Ltd. which is effective against Clostridioides difficile, a major cause of drug resistant diarrhea in the elderly. Current drug treatments for this infection involve orally delivered antibiotics, principally fidaxomicin, metronidazole and vancomycin; the last two drugs are the principal therapeutic agents in use, but fail in approximately 20 to 45% of the cases. The drug works by inhibiting the synthesis of proteins in the bacteria, thus inhibiting the production of toxins and the formation of spores. Cadazolid progressed through to Phase III clinical trials, but in its financial results for Q1 2018, Idorsia mentions that Actelion informed them that "following completion of Phase 3 data analysis of cadazolid - it has decided to discontinue the development of the compound."

== Structure ==
The chemical structure of cadazolid combines the pharmacophores of oxazolidinone and fluoroquinolone antibiotics.

== Clinical trials ==
In a study published in the journal Anaerobe, cadazolid has been shown to be effective in vitro against 133 strains of Clostridioides difficile all collected from Sweden.

In phase I tests, sixty four male patients reacted favourably to cadazolid which primarily acted and remained in the colon while displaying little toxicity even in regimes involving large doses.

== See also ==
- Fidaxomicin
- Ridinilazole
- SCHEMBL19952957
- Surotomycin
