= Luedemannella helvata =

Scientific classification
- Domain: Bacteria
- Kingdom: Bacillati
- Phylum: Actinomycetota
- Class: Actinomycetes
- Order: Micromonosporales
- Family: Micromonosporaceae
- Genus: Luedemannella
- Species: L. helvata

Binomial name
- Luedemannella helvata Ara and Kudo 2007

Type strain
- JCM 13249; MTCC 8091; 3-9(24)

Species of bacterium

Luedemannella helvata is a bacterium from the genus Luedemannella which has been isolated from soil.
