= SCHEMBL19952957 =

Chemical compound

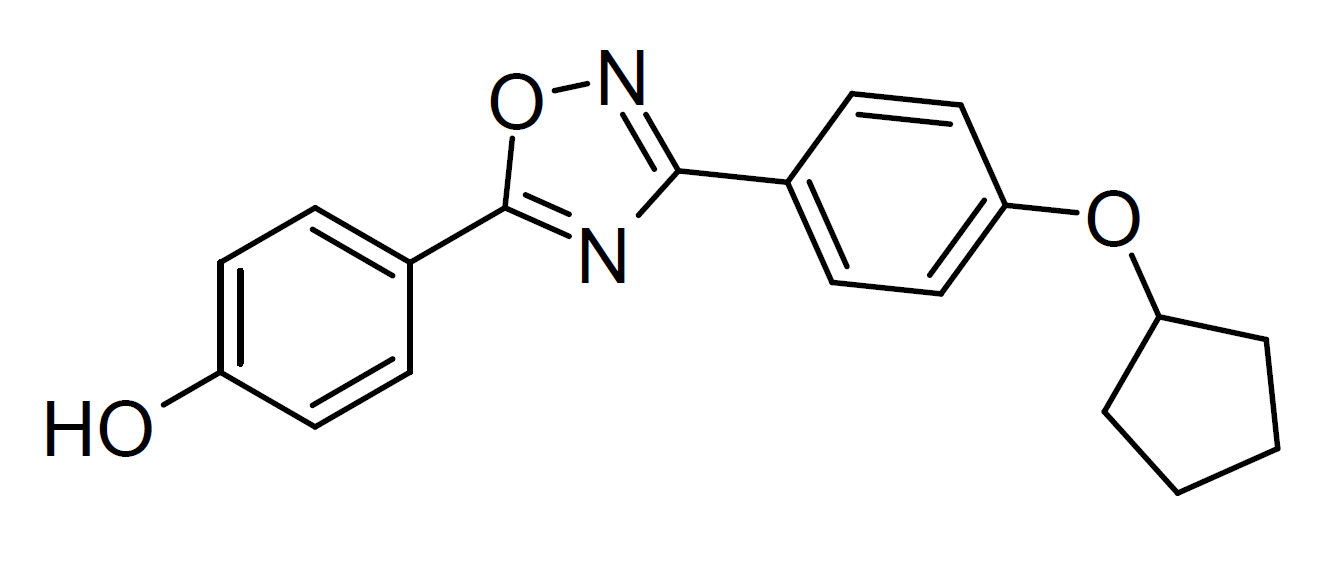

Identifiers
- IUPAC name: 4-[3-(4-cyclopentyloxyphenyl)-1,2,4-oxadiazol-5-yl]phenol
- CAS Number: 1893420-86-4
- PubChem CID: 137279743

Chemical and physical data
- Formula: C_{19}H_{18}N_{2}O_{3}
- Molar mass: 322.364 g·mol^{−1}
- 3D model (JSmol): Interactive image
- SMILES: C1CCC(C1)OC2=CC=C(C=C2)C3=NOC(=N3)C4=CC=C(C=C4)O
- InChI: InChI=1S/C19H18N2O3/c22-15-9-5-14(6-10-15)19-20-18(21-24-19)13-7-11-17(12-8-13)23-16-3-1-2-4-16/h5-12,16,22H,1-4H2; Key:LTWUHRPUKBTFBZ-UHFFFAOYSA-N

SCHEMBL19952957 is an oxadiazole based antibiotic, originally developed in 2014 as a potential treatment for infections with methicillin-resistant Staphylococcus aureus (MRSA) and other antibiotic-resistant bacteria. Subsequently, it has been found to be useful against Clostridioides difficile as it not only kills active bacteria but also inhibits the germination of the dormant spores which can otherwise often lead to persistent infections that repeatedly recur upon cessation of antibiotic treatment. While it is still only being researched in animals at this stage, this dual action is a significant advance over existing antibiotics, and it is likely that drugs from this class may be developed as new medications for the treatment of antibiotic-resistant infections in humans.

== See also ==
- Cadazolid
- Fidaxomicin
- Ridinilazole
- Surotomycin
