= Longispora fulva =

Scientific classification
- Domain: Bacteria
- Kingdom: Bacillati
- Phylum: Actinomycetota
- Class: Actinomycetes
- Order: Micromonosporales
- Family: Micromonosporaceae
- Genus: Longispora
- Species: L. fulva

Binomial name
- Longispora fulva Shiratori-Takano et al. 2011

Type strain
- DSM 45356; KZ0017; NBRC 105670

Species of bacterium

Longispora fulva is a bacterium from the genus Longispora which has been isolated from soil from a Zelkova forest from Ohnuma, Fukushima Prefecture, Japan.
