= Micromonospora viridifaciens =

Scientific classification
- Domain: Bacteria
- Kingdom: Bacillati
- Phylum: Actinomycetota
- Class: Actinomycetia
- Order: Micromonosporales
- Family: Micromonosporaceae
- Genus: Micromonospora
- Species: M. viridifaciens

Binomial name
- Micromonospora viridifaciens Kroppenstedt et al. 2005

Type strain
- ATCC 31146; DSM 43909; JCM 3267; NBRC 101887

Species of bacterium

Micromonospora viridifaciens is an endophytic actinomycete.
