= Longispora urticae =

Scientific classification
- Domain: Bacteria
- Kingdom: Bacillati
- Phylum: Actinomycetota
- Class: Actinomycetes
- Order: Micromonosporales
- Family: Micromonosporaceae
- Genus: Longispora
- Species: L. urticae

Binomial name
- Longispora urticae Piao et al. 2017

Type strain
- CCTCC AA 2017017; DSM 105119; NEAU-PCY-3

Species of bacterium

Longispora urticae is a Gram-positive and aerobic bacterium from the genus Longispora which has been isolated from rhizospheric soil from the plant Urtica urens from Anshan, China.
