= Micromonospora gifhornensis =

Scientific classification
- Domain: Bacteria
- Kingdom: Bacillati
- Phylum: Actinomycetota
- Class: Actinomycetia
- Order: Micromonosporales
- Family: Micromonosporaceae
- Genus: Micromonospora
- Species: M. gifhornensis

Binomial name
- Micromonospora gifhornensis (Rheims et al. 1998) Nouioui et al. 2018

Type strain
- DSM 44337; HR1-2; IFO 16317; JCM 10457; KACC 20946; NBRC 16317

Synonyms
- Verrucosispora gifhornensis Rheims et al. 1998

Species of bacterium

Micromonospora gifhornensis is a Gram-positive bacterium from the genus Micromonospora. It is Gram-positive, aerobic and spore-forming.
