= Micromonospora peucetia =

Scientific classification
- Domain: Bacteria
- Kingdom: Bacillati
- Phylum: Actinomycetota
- Class: Actinomycetia
- Order: Micromonosporales
- Family: Micromonosporaceae
- Genus: Micromonospora
- Species: M. peucetia

Binomial name
- Micromonospora peucetia Kroppenstedt et al. 2005

Type strain
- DSM 43363; JCM 12820; NBRC 101886

Synonyms
- "Micromonospora peucetica" Arcamone et al. 1980

Species of bacterium

Micromonospora peucetia is an endophytic actinomycete.
