= Ridinilazole =

Chemical compound

Clinical data
- Other names: SMT19969
- ATC code: None

Identifiers
- IUPAC name: 2,2'-Di(pyridin-4-yl)-1H,1'H-5,5'-bi(benzimidazole)
- CAS Number: 308362-25-6
- PubChem CID: 16659285
- ChemSpider: 17592423
- UNII: 06DX01190R
- KEGG: D11958
- CompTox Dashboard (EPA): DTXSID101028337

Chemical and physical data
- Formula: C_{24}H_{16}N_{6}
- Molar mass: 388.434 g·mol^{−1}
- 3D model (JSmol): Interactive image
- SMILES: c6cc(c5nc4ccc(c3ccc2nc(c1ccncc1)[nH]c2c3)cc4[nH]5)ccn6

Ridinilazole (previously known as SMT19969) is an investigational small molecule antibiotic under evaluation for oral administration for the treatment of Clostridioides difficile infection (CDI). In vitro, it demonstrates bactericidal activity against C. difficile and suppresses bacterial toxin production; the mechanism of action is thought to involve inhibition of cell division. It possesses desirable properties for the treatment of CDI, namely that it is a narrow-spectrum antibiotic which exhibits activity against C. difficile while having little impact on other normal intestinal flora and that it is only minimally absorbed systemically after oral administration. When Ridinilazole was originally developed, there were only three antibiotics in use for treating CDI: vancomycin, fidaxomicin, and metronidazole. The recurrence rate of CDI is high, which has spurred research into other treatment options with the aimed reduce the rate of recurrence.

As of 2019, two phase II trials had been completed and two phase III trials comparing ridinilazole with vancomycin for CDI were anticipated to conclude in September 2021. Ridinilazole was designated as a Qualified Infectious Disease Product (QIDP) and was granted Fast Track status by the U.S. FDA. Fast Track status is reserved for drugs designed to treat diseases where there is currently a gap in the treatment, or a complete lack thereof. The QIDP designation adds five more years of exclusivity for ridinazole upon approval.

== See also ==
- Cadazolid
- Fidaxomicin
- SCHEMBL19952957
- Surotomycin
