= Micromonospora qiuiae =

Scientific classification
- Domain: Bacteria
- Kingdom: Bacillati
- Phylum: Actinomycetota
- Class: Actinomycetia
- Order: Micromonosporales
- Family: Micromonosporaceae
- Genus: Micromonospora
- Species: M. qiuiae

Binomial name
- Micromonospora qiuiae (Xi et al. 2012) Nouioui et al. 2018

Type strain
- CGMCC 4.5826; RtIII47; NBRC 106684

Synonyms
- Verrucosispora qiuiae Xi et al. 2012

Species of bacterium

Micromonospora qiuiae is a Gram-positive bacterium from the genus Micromonospora which has been isolated from mangrove soil in Sanya, China.
