= Micromonospora andamanensis =

Scientific classification
- Domain: Bacteria
- Kingdom: Bacillati
- Phylum: Actinomycetota
- Class: Actinomycetes
- Order: Micromonosporales
- Family: Micromonosporaceae
- Genus: Micromonospora
- Species: M. andamanensis

Binomial name
- Micromonospora andamanensis (Supong et al. 2013) Nouioui et al. 2018

Type strain
- BCC 45620; NBRC 109075; SP03-05

Synonyms
- Verrucosispora andamanensis Supong et al. 2013

Species of bacterium

Micromonospora andamanensis is a Gram-positive bacterium from the genus Micromonospora which has been isolated from the sponge Xestospongia near Phuket, Thailand.
