= Micromonospora fiedleri =

Scientific classification
- Domain: Bacteria
- Kingdom: Bacillati
- Phylum: Actinomycetota
- Class: Actinomycetia
- Order: Micromonosporales
- Family: Micromonosporaceae
- Genus: Micromonospora
- Species: M. fiedleri

Binomial name
- Micromonospora fiedleri (Goodfellow et al. 2013) Nouioui et al. 2018

Type strain
- MG-37; NCIMB 14794; NRRL B-24892; NRRL-B-24892

Synonyms
- Verrucosispora fiedleri Goodfellow et al. 2013

Species of bacterium

Micromonospora fiedleri is a Gram-positive bacterium from the genus Micromonospora which has been isolated from sediments from Norway.
