= Salinosporamide A =

Names
- Preferred IUPAC name (1R,4R,5S)-4-(2-Chloroethyl)-1-{(S)-[(1S)-cyclohex-2-en-1-yl](hydroxy)methyl}-5-methyl-6-oxa-2-azabicyclo[3.2.0]heptane-3,7-dione
- Other names Marizomib; NPI-0052

Identifiers
CAS Number	437742-34-2
3D model (JSmol)	Interactive image; Interactive image
ChEBI	CHEBI:48045
ChEMBL	ChEMBL371405
ChemSpider	9522473
KEGG	D09640
PubChem CID	11347535
UNII	703P9YDP7F
CompTox Dashboard (EPA)	DTXSID00904019
- InChI: InChI=1S/C15H20ClNO4/c1-14-10(7-8-16)12(19)17-15(14,13(20)21-14)11(18)9-5-3-2-4-6-9/h3,5,9-11,18H,2,4,6-8H2,1H3,(H,17,19)/t9-,10+,11+,14+,15+/m1/s1 Key: NGWSFRIPKNWYAO-SHTIJGAHSA-N; InChI=1/C15H20ClNO4/c1-14-10(7-8-16)12(19)17-15(14,13(20)21-14)11(18)9-5-3-2-4-6-9/h3,5,9-11,18H,2,4,6-8H2,1H3,(H,17,19)/t9-,10+,11+,14+,15+/m1/s1 Key: NGWSFRIPKNWYAO-SHTIJGAHBB
- SMILES: O=C1O[C@@]3(C)[C@H](C(=O)N[C@@]13[C@@H](O)[C@@H]2/C=C\CCC2)CCCl; C[C@]13OC(=O)C3(NC(=O)[C@@H]1CCCl)[C@@H](O)C2/C=C\CCC2

Properties
Chemical formula	C_{15}H_{20}ClNO_{4}
Molar mass	313.781 g/mol
- Except where otherwise noted, data are given for materials in their standard state (at 25 °C [77 °F], 100 kPa). verify (what is ?) Infobox references

Salinosporamide A (Marizomib) is a potent proteasome inhibitor being studied as a potential anticancer agent. It entered phase I human clinical trials for the treatment of multiple myeloma, only three years after its discovery in 2003. This marine natural product is produced by the obligate marine bacteria Salinispora tropica and Salinispora arenicola, which are found in ocean sediment. Salinosporamide A belongs to a family of compounds, known collectively as salinosporamides, which possess a densely functionalized γ-lactam-β-lactone bicyclic core.

== History ==
Salinosporamide A was discovered by William Fenical and Paul Jensen from Scripps Institution of Oceanography in La Jolla, CA. In preliminary screening, a high percentage of the organic extracts of cultured Salinispora strains possessed antibiotic and anticancer activities, which suggests that these bacteria are an excellent resource for drug discovery. Salinispora strain CNB-392 was isolated from a heat-treated marine sediment sample and cytotoxicity-guided fractionation of the crude extract led to the isolation of salinosporamide A. Although salinosporamide A shares an identical bicyclic ring structure with omuralide, it is uniquely functionalized. Salinosporamide A displayed potent in vitro cytotoxicity against HCT-116 human colon carcinoma with an IC50 value of 11 ng mL-1. This compound also displayed potent and highly selective activity in the NCI's 60-cell-line panel with a mean GI50 value (the concentration required to achieve 50% growth inhibition) of less than 10 nM and a greater than 4 log LC50 differential between resistant and susceptible cell lines. The greatest potency was observed against NCI-H226 non-small cell lung cancer, SF-539 brain tumor, SK-MEL-28 melanoma, and MDA-MB-435 melanoma (formerly misclassified as breast cancer), all with LC50 values less than 10 nM. Salinosporamide A was tested for its effects on proteasome function because of its structural relationship to omuralide. When tested against purified 20S proteasome, salinosporamide A inhibited proteasomal chymotrypsin-like proteolytic activity with an IC50 value of 1.3 nM. This compound is approximately 35 times more potent than omuralide which was tested as a positive control in the same assay. Thus, the unique functionalization of the core bicyclic ring structure of salinosporamide A appears to have resulted in a molecule that is a significantly more potent proteasome inhibitor than omuralide.

== Mechanism of action ==
Salinosporamide A inhibits proteasome activity by covalently modifying the active site threonine residues of the 20S proteasome.

== Biosynthesis ==
Salinosporamide A and B building blocks

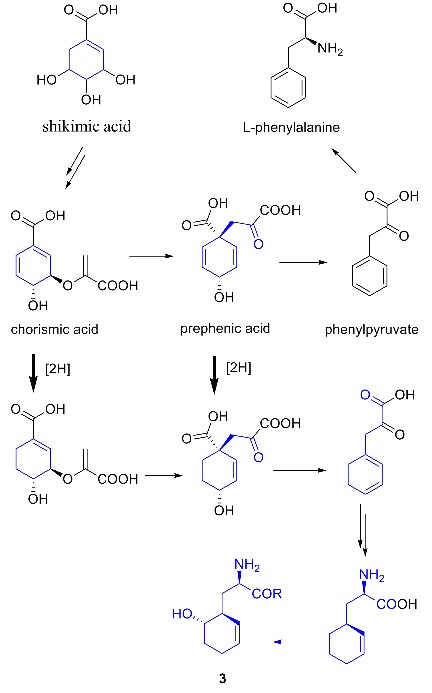
Proposed biosynthesis of the nonproteinogenic amino-acid beta-hydroxycyclohex-2'-enylanine (3) (R = H or S~PCP) via a shunt in the phenylalanine biosynthetic pathway

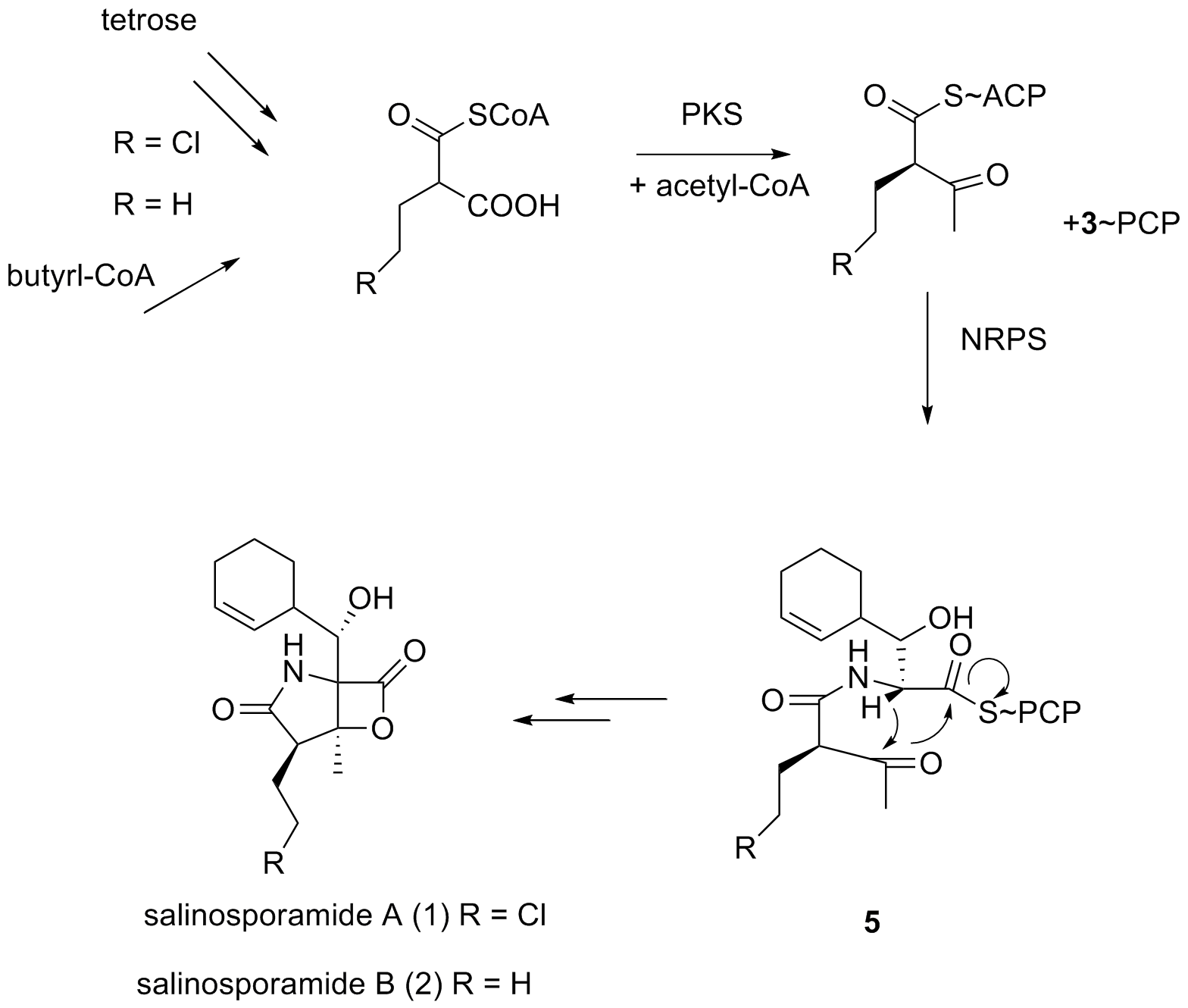
Biosynthesis

It was originally hypothesized that salinosporamide B was a biosynthetic precursor to salinosporamide A due to their structural similarities.

It was thought that the halogenation of the unactivated methyl group was catalyzed by a non-heme iron halogenase. Recent work using ^{13}C-labeled feeding experiments reveal distinct biosynthetic origins of salinosporamide A and B.

While they share the biosynthetic precursors acetate and presumed β-hydroxycyclohex-2'-enylalanine (3), they differ in the origin of the four-carbon building block that gives rise to their structural differences involving the halogen atom. A hybrid polyketide synthase-nonribosomal peptide synthetase (PKS-NRPS) pathway is most likely the biosynthetic mechanism in which acetyl-CoA and butyrate-derived ethylmalonyl-CoA condense to yield the β-ketothioester (4), which then reacts with (3) to generate the linear precursor (5).

== Total synthesis ==
The first stereoselective synthesis was reported by Rajender Reddy Leleti and E. J.Corey. Later several routes to the total synthesis of salinosporamide A have been reported.

== Clinical study ==
In vitro studies using purified 20S proteasomes showed that salinosporamide A has lower EC50 for trypsin-like (T-L) activity than does bortezomib. In vivo animal model studies show marked inhibition of T-L activity in response to salinosporamide A, whereas bortezomib enhances T-L proteasome activity.

Initial results from early-stage clinical trials of salinosporamide A in relapsed/refractory multiple myeloma patients were presented at the 2011 American Society of Hematology annual meeting. Further early-stage trials of the drug in a number of different cancers are ongoing.
