= Phytohabitans suffuscus =

Scientific classification
- Domain: Bacteria
- Kingdom: Bacillati
- Phylum: Actinomycetota
- Class: Actinomycetes
- Order: Micromonosporales
- Family: Micromonosporaceae
- Genus: Phytohabitans
- Species: P. suffuscus

Binomial name
- Phytohabitans suffuscus Inahashi et al. 2010

Type strain
- DSM 45306; NBRC 105367; K07-0523

Species of bacterium

Phytohabitans suffuscus is a bacterium from the genus Phytohabitans which has been isolated from roots from an orchid in Okinawa Prefecture, Japan.
