= Salinispora pacifica =

Scientific classification
- Domain: Bacteria
- Kingdom: Bacillati
- Phylum: Actinomycetota
- Class: Actinomycetia
- Order: Micromonosporales
- Family: Micromonosporaceae
- Genus: Salinispora
- Species: S. pacifica

Binomial name
- Salinispora pacifica Ahmed et al. 2014

Type strain
- CNR-114; DSM 45820; KACC 17160

Species of bacterium

Salinispora pacifica is an obligate marine actinomycetes bacterium species in the genus Salinispora.

== See also ==
- Salinispora tropica
- Salinispora arenicola
