= Hamadaea flava =

Scientific classification
- Domain: Bacteria
- Kingdom: Bacillati
- Phylum: Actinomycetota
- Class: Actinomycetes
- Order: Micromonosporales
- Family: Micromonosporaceae
- Genus: Hamadaea
- Species: H. flava

Binomial name
- Hamadaea flava Chu et al. 2016

Type strain
- CGMCC 4.7289; CPCC 204160; KCTC 39591; YIM C0533

Species of bacterium

Hamadaea flava is a Gram-positive, aerobic and non-motile bacterium from the genus Hamadaea which has been isolated from soil from a tobacco farm from Yunnan, China.
