= Micromonospora palomenae =

Scientific classification
- Domain: Bacteria
- Kingdom: Bacillati
- Phylum: Actinomycetota
- Class: Actinomycetia
- Order: Micromonosporales
- Family: Micromonosporaceae
- Genus: Micromonospora
- Species: M. palomenae

Binomial name
- Micromonospora palomenae Fang et al. 2015

Type strain
- CGMCC 4.7175; JCM 30056; NEAU-CX1

Species of bacterium

Micromonospora palomenae is a bacterium from the genus Micromonospora which has been isolated from the nymphs of the bug Palomena viridissima in Harbin, China.
