= Micromonospora profundi =

Scientific classification
- Domain: Bacteria
- Kingdom: Bacillati
- Phylum: Actinomycetota
- Class: Actinomycetes
- Order: Micromonosporales
- Family: Micromonosporaceae
- Genus: Micromonospora
- Species: M. profundi

Binomial name
- Micromonospora profundi Veyisoglu et al. 2016

Type strain
- DSM 45981; KCTC 29243; DS3010

Species of bacterium

Micromonospora profundi is a bacterium from the genus Micromonospora which has been isolated from deep marine sediments from the Black Sea.
