= Micromonospora lupini =

Scientific classification
- Domain: Bacteria
- Kingdom: Bacillati
- Phylum: Actinomycetota
- Class: Actinomycetia
- Order: Micromonosporales
- Family: Micromonosporaceae
- Genus: Micromonospora
- Species: M. lupini

Binomial name
- Micromonospora lupini Trujillo et al. 2007

Type strain
- DSM 44874; JCM 16031; LMG 24055; Lupac14N

Synonyms
- "Micromonospora lupini" Igarashi et al. 2007

Species of bacterium

Micromonospora lupini is an endophytic actinomycete notable for producing antitumour anthraquinones: lupinacidins A (1), B (2) and C. Its genome has been sequenced.
