= Micromonospora sediminimaris =

Scientific classification
- Domain: Bacteria
- Kingdom: Bacillati
- Phylum: Actinomycetota
- Class: Actinomycetia
- Order: Micromonosporales
- Family: Micromonosporaceae
- Genus: Micromonospora
- Species: M. sediminimaris

Binomial name
- Micromonospora sediminimaris Nouioui et al. 2018

Type strain
- CGMCC 4.3550; JCM 15670; MS426

Synonyms
- Verrucosispora sediminis Dai et al. 2010

Species of bacterium

Micromonospora sediminimaris is a Gram-positive bacterium from the genus Micromonospora which has been isolated from deep sea sediments from the South China Sea.
