= Salinispora arenicola =

Scientific classification
- Domain: Bacteria
- Kingdom: Bacillati
- Phylum: Actinomycetota
- Class: Actinomycetes
- Order: Micromonosporales
- Family: Micromonosporaceae
- Genus: Salinispora
- Species: S. arenicola

Binomial name
- Salinispora arenicola Maldonado et al. 2005

Type strain
- ATCC BAA-917; CNH-643; DSM 44819; JCM 13856

Species of bacterium

Salinispora arenicola is an obligate marine actinomycete bacterium species. It produces salinosporamide, a potential anti-cancer agent.

== See also ==
- Salinispora tropica
- Salinispora pacifica
