= Dactylosporangium luteum =

Scientific classification
- Domain: Bacteria
- Kingdom: Bacillati
- Phylum: Actinomycetota
- Class: Actinomycetes
- Order: Micromonosporales
- Family: Micromonosporaceae
- Genus: Dactylosporangium
- Species: D. luteum

Binomial name
- Dactylosporangium luteum Kim et al. 2010

Type strain
- BK51; DSM 45323; JCM 17685; KACC 20899; NRRL B-24774

Species of bacterium

Dactylosporangium luteum is a bacterium from the genus Dactylosporangium which has been isolated from soil from a hay meadow from the Cockle Park Experimental Farm, Northumberland, England.
