= Asanoa iriomotensis =

Scientific classification
- Domain: Bacteria
- Kingdom: Bacillati
- Phylum: Actinomycetota
- Class: Actinomycetes
- Order: Micromonosporales
- Family: Micromonosporaceae
- Genus: Asanoa
- Species: A. iriomotensis

Binomial name
- Asanoa iriomotensis Tamura and Sakane 2005

Type strain
- BCRC 16825; CCRC 16825; CIP 108714; DSM 44745; JCM 13312; NBRC 100142; TT 97-02

Species of bacterium

Asanoa iriomotensis is a bacterium from the genus Asanoa which has been isolated from mangrove soil in Japan.
