= Micromonospora coxensis =

Scientific classification
- Domain: Bacteria
- Kingdom: Bacillati
- Phylum: Actinomycetota
- Class: Actinomycetia
- Order: Micromonosporales
- Family: Micromonosporaceae
- Genus: Micromonospora
- Species: M. coxensis

Binomial name
- Micromonospora coxensis Ara and Kudo 2007

Type strain
- 2-30-b(28); DSM 45161; JCM 13248; MTCC 8093

Species of bacterium

Micromonospora coxensis is an endophytic actinomycete first isolated from sandy soil in Bangladesh; it produces single, non-motile nodular spore surfaces.
