= Galtamycin B =

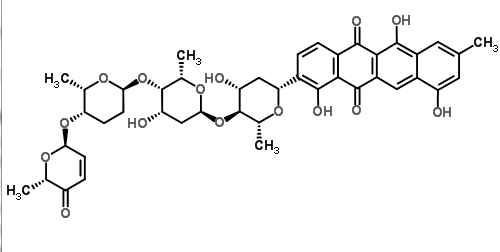

Names
- IUPAC name 1,6,10-Trihydroxy-8-methyl-2-[(2,3,6-trideoxy-α-L-glycero-hex-2-enopyranosyl-4-ulose)-(1→4)-(2,3,6-trideoxy-α-L-threo-hexopyranosyl)-(1→4)-(2,6-dideoxy-α-L-lyxo-hexopyranosyl)-(1→4)-(2,6-dideoxy-β-D-arabino-hexopyranosyl)]tetracene-5,12-dione
- Systematic IUPAC name (2^{2}R,2^{4}R,2^{5}S,2^{6}R,4^{2}S,4^{4}S,4^{5}S,4^{6}S,6^{2}S,6^{5}S,6^{6}S,8^{2}R,8^{6}S)-1^{1},1^{6},1^{10},2^{4},4^{4}-Pentahydroxy-1^{8},2^{6},4^{6},6^{6},8^{6}-pentamethyl-8^{2}H-3,5,7-trioxa-8(2)-pyrana-2,4,6(2,5)-tris(oxana)-1(2)-tetracenaoctaphane-1^{5},1^{12},8^{5}(8^{6}H)-trione

Identifiers
CAS Number	855779-79-2
3D model (JSmol)	Interactive image
ChemSpider	9938973
PubChem CID	72823501
UNII	NP8M36JU4W
- InChI: InChI=1S/C43H48O15/c1-17-12-25-24(28(45)13-17)14-26-37(40(25)50)39(49)23-7-6-22(38(48)36(23)41(26)51)32-15-29(46)42(20(4)52-32)58-35-16-30(47)43(21(5)55-35)57-34-11-9-31(19(3)54-34)56-33-10-8-27(44)18(2)53-33/h6-8,10,12-14,18-21,29-35,42-43,45-48,50H,9,11,15-16H2,1-5H3/t18-,19-,20+,21-,29+,30-,31-,32+,33-,34-,35-,42+,43+/m0/s1 Key: NWYUSUAHSWSTCK-UHCMZIKDSA-N
- SMILES: O=C1\C=C/[C@@H](O[C@H]1C)O[C@H]2CC[C@@H](O[C@H]2C)O[C@@H]8[C@@H](O[C@@H](O[C@H]3[C@H](O)C[C@@H](O[C@@H]3C)c7ccc6C(=O)c5c(O)c4cc(cc(O)c4cc5C(=O)c6c7O)C)C[C@@H]8O)C

Properties
Chemical formula	C_{43}H_{48}O_{15}
Molar mass	804.842 g·mol^{−1}
- Except where otherwise noted, data are given for materials in their standard state (at 25 °C [77 °F], 100 kPa). Infobox references

Galtamycin B is a chemical compound that has been isolated from Micromonospora.
