= Dactylosporangium siamense =

Scientific classification
- Domain: Bacteria
- Kingdom: Bacillati
- Phylum: Actinomycetota
- Class: Actinomycetes
- Order: Micromonosporales
- Family: Micromonosporaceae
- Genus: Dactylosporangium
- Species: D. siamense

Binomial name
- Dactylosporangium siamense Thawai and Suriyachadkun 2013

Type strain
- BCC 34901; MW4-36; NBRC 106093

Species of bacterium

Dactylosporangium siamense is a bacterium from the genus Dactylosporangium which has been isolated from forest soil in Nakhon Sawan, Thailand.
