= Micromonospora oryzae =

Scientific classification
- Domain: Bacteria
- Kingdom: Bacillati
- Phylum: Actinomycetota
- Class: Actinomycetia
- Order: Micromonosporales
- Family: Micromonosporaceae
- Genus: Micromonospora
- Species: M. oryzae

Binomial name
- Micromonospora oryzae Kittiwongwattana et al. 2015

Type strain
- BCC 67266; CP2R9-1; NBRC 110007

Species of bacterium

Micromonospora oryzae is a bacterium from the genus Micromonospora which has been isolated from the roots of upland rice (Oryza sativa).
