= Micromonospora inyonensis =

Scientific classification
- Domain: Bacteria
- Kingdom: Bacillati
- Phylum: Actinomycetota
- Class: Actinomycetia
- Order: Micromonosporales
- Family: Micromonosporaceae
- Genus: Micromonospora
- Species: M. inyonensis

Binomial name
- Micromonospora inyonensis Kroppenstedt et al. 2005

Type strain
- ATCC 27600; DSM 46123; IFO 13156; JCM 3188; NBRC 13156; NRRL 3292

Species of bacterium

Micromonospora inyonensis is an endophytic actinomycete.
