= Phytohabitans flavus =

Scientific classification
- Domain: Bacteria
- Kingdom: Bacillati
- Phylum: Actinomycetota
- Class: Actinomycetes
- Order: Micromonosporales
- Family: Micromonosporaceae
- Genus: Phytohabitans
- Species: P. flavus

Binomial name
- Phytohabitans flavus Inahashi et al. 2012

Type strain
- DSM 45551; JCM 17387; NBRC 107702; K09-0627

Species of bacterium

Phytohabitans flavus is a bacterium from the genus Phytohabitans which has been isolated from roots of an orchid in Okinawa Prefecture, Japan.
