= Adenosyl-chloride synthase =

Class of enzymes

Identifiers
- EC no.: 2.5.1.94

Databases
- IntEnz: IntEnz view
- BRENDA: BRENDA entry
- ExPASy: NiceZyme view
- KEGG: KEGG entry
- MetaCyc: metabolic pathway
- PRIAM: profile
- PDB structures: RCSB PDB PDBe PDBsum
Search
- PMC: articles
- PubMed: articles
- NCBI: proteins

Adenosyl-chloride synthase (EC 2.5.1.94, chlorinase, 5'-chloro-5'-deoxyadenosine synthase) is an enzyme with systematic name S-adenosyl-L-methionine:chloride adenosyltransferase. It was characterised from the marine bacterium, Salinispora tropica, and catalyses a chemical reaction that converts S-adenosyl methionine to 5'-chloro-5'-deoxyadenosine and L-methionine using a chloride ion (Cl^{−}):

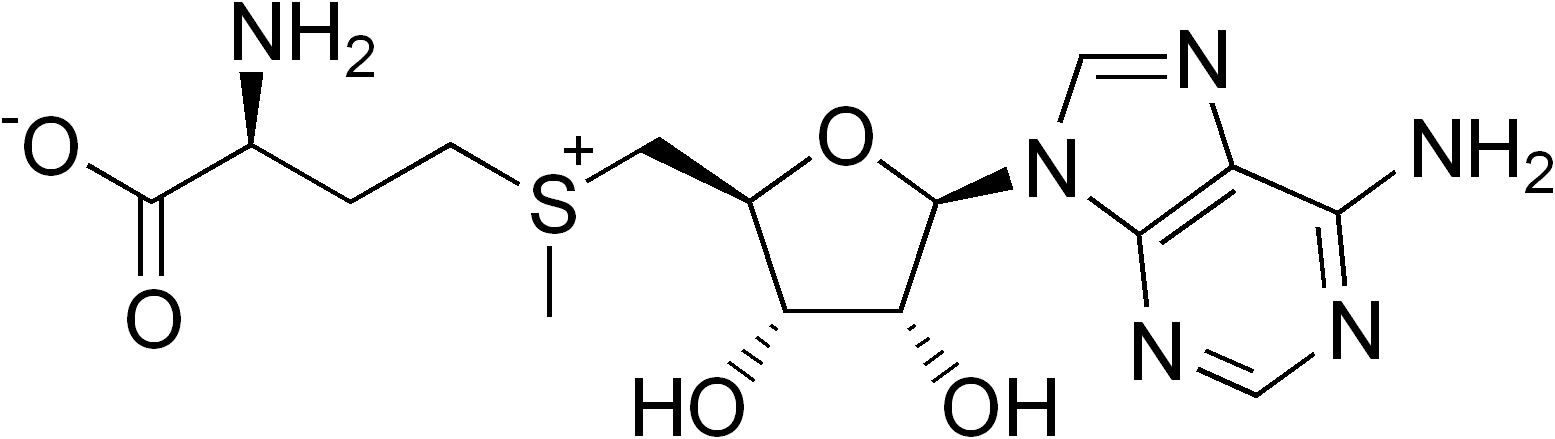
S-Adenosyl methionine
Cl^{−}
5'-chloro-5'-deoxyadenosine
+
L-methionine
