= Micromonospora lutea =

Scientific classification
- Domain: Bacteria
- Kingdom: Bacillati
- Phylum: Actinomycetota
- Class: Actinomycetia
- Order: Micromonosporales
- Family: Micromonosporaceae
- Genus: Micromonospora
- Species: M. lutea

Binomial name
- Micromonospora lutea (Liao et al. 2009) Nouioui et al. 2018

Type strain
- CCTCC AA207012; JCM 16959; KCTC 19195; YIM 013

Synonyms
- Verrucosispora lutea Liao et al. 2009

Species of bacterium

Micromonospora lutea is a Gram-positive, aerobic and spore-forming bacterium from the genus Micromonospora which has been isolated from mangrove sediments in Guangdong Province, China.
