= Actinocatenispora rupis =

Scientific classification
- Domain: Bacteria
- Kingdom: Bacillati
- Phylum: Actinomycetota
- Class: Actinomycetes
- Order: Micromonosporales
- Family: Micromonosporaceae
- Genus: Actinocatenispora
- Species: A. rupis

Binomial name
- Actinocatenispora rupis Seo and Lee 2009

Type strain
- CS5-AC17; DSM 45178; JCM 16894; NRRL B-24660

Species of bacterium

Actinocatenispora rupis is an aerobic bacterium from the genus Actinocatenispora which has been isolated from cliff soil from Mara Island, Korea.
