= Micromonospora fulviviridis =

Scientific classification
- Domain: Bacteria
- Kingdom: Bacillati
- Phylum: Actinomycetota
- Class: Actinomycetia
- Order: Micromonosporales
- Family: Micromonosporaceae
- Genus: Micromonospora
- Species: M. fulviviridis

Binomial name
- Micromonospora fulviviridis Kroppenstedt et al. 2005

Type strain
- ATCC 35574; DSM 43906; JCM 3259; NRRL B-16104

Species of bacterium

Micromonospora fulviviridis is an endophytic actinomycete.
