= Surotomycin =

Investigational oral antibiotic

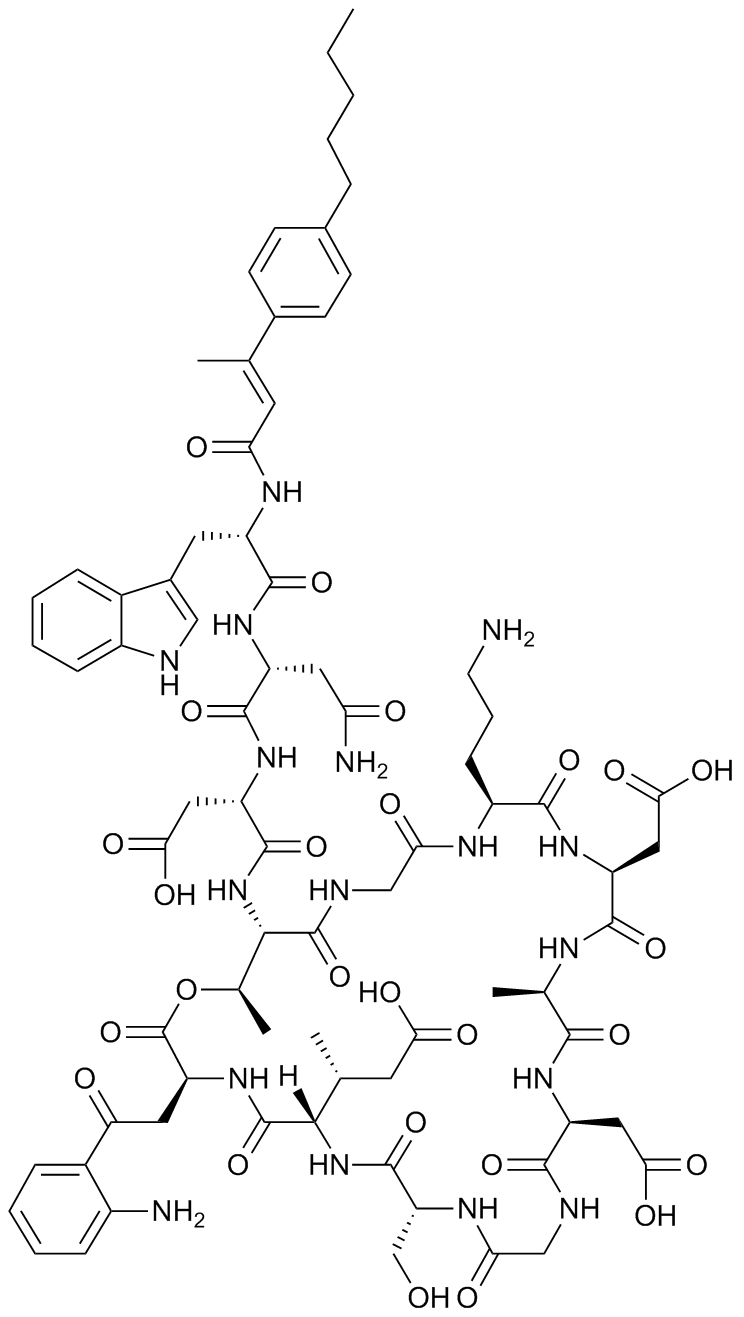

Names
- IUPAC name (3S)-3-{[(3S,6S,9R,15S,18R,21S,24S,30S,31R)-3-[2-(2-aminophenyl)-2-oxoethyl]-24-(3-aminopropyl)-15,21-bis(carboxymethyl)-6-[(2R)-1-carboxypropan-2-yl]-9-(hydroxymethyl)-18,31-dimethyl-2,5,8,11,14,17,20,23,26,29-decaoxo-1-oxa-4,7,10,13,16,19,22,25,28-nonaazacyclohentriacontan-30-yl]carbamoyl}-3-[(2R)-3-carbamoyl-2-[(2R)-3-(1H-indol-3-yl)-2-[(2E)-3-(4-pentylphenyl)but-2-enamido]propanamido]propanamido]propanoic acid

Identifiers
CAS Number	1233389-51-9
3D model (JSmol)	Interactive image
ChEMBL	ChEMBL2375161
ChemSpider	28527704
KEGG	D10380
PubChem CID	46700778
UNII	ON0N776N05
CompTox Dashboard (EPA)	DTXSID60153980
- InChI: InChI=1S/C77H101N17O26/c1-6-7-8-14-41-20-22-42(23-21-41)37(2)25-58(98)86-49(27-43-33-81-47-18-12-10-15-44(43)47)71(113)89-50(29-57(80)97)72(114)91-53(32-64(107)108)73(115)94-66-40(5)120-77(119)54(28-56(96)45-16-9-11-17-46(45)79)92-76(118)65(38(3)26-61(101)102)93-74(116)55(36-95)87-60(100)34-82-68(110)51(30-62(103)104)88-67(109)39(4)84-70(112)52(31-63(105)106)90-69(111)48(19-13-24-78)85-59(99)35-83-75(66)117/h9-12,15-18,20-23,25,33,38-40,48-55,65-66,81,95H,6-8,13-14,19,24,26-32,34-36,78-79H2,1-5H3,(H2,80,97)(H,82,110)(H,83,117)(H,84,112)(H,85,99)(H,86,98)(H,87,100)(H,88,109)(H,89,113)(H,90,111)(H,91,114)(H,92,118)(H,93,116)(H,94,115)(H,101,102)(H,103,104)(H,105,106)(H,107,108)/b37-25+/t38-,39-,40-,48+,49+,50-,51+,52+,53+,54+,55-,65+,66+/m1/s1 Key: DYNMYYRPPFVAKR-CWXHRMTKSA-N; InChI=1/C77H101N17O26/c1-6-7-8-14-41-20-22-42(23-21-41)37(2)25-58(98)86-49(27-43-33-81-47-18-12-10-15-44(43)47)71(113)89-50(29-57(80)97)72(114)91-53(32-64(107)108)73(115)94-66-40(5)120-77(119)54(28-56(96)45-16-9-11-17-46(45)79)92-76(118)65(38(3)26-61(101)102)93-74(116)55(36-95)87-60(100)34-82-68(110)51(30-62(103)104)88-67(109)39(4)84-70(112)52(31-63(105)106)90-69(111)48(19-13-24-78)85-59(99)35-83-75(66)117/h9-12,15-18,20-23,25,33,38-40,48-55,65-66,81,95H,6-8,13-14,19,24,26-32,34-36,78-79H2,1-5H3,(H2,80,97)(H,82,110)(H,83,117)(H,84,112)(H,85,99)(H,86,98)(H,87,100)(H,88,109)(H,89,113)(H,90,111)(H,91,114)(H,92,118)(H,93,116)(H,94,115)(H,101,102)(H,103,104)(H,105,106)(H,107,108)/b37-25+/t38-,39-,40-,48+,49+,50-,51+,52+,53+,54+,55-,65+,66+/m1/s1 Key: DYNMYYRPPFVAKR-CWXHRMTKBW
- SMILES: CCCCCc1ccc(cc1)/C(=C/C(=O)N[C@@H](Cc2c[nH]c3c2cccc3)C(=O)N[C@H](CC(=O)N)C(=O)N[C@@H](CC(=O)O)C(=O)N[C@H]4[C@H](OC(=O)[C@@H](NC(=O)[C@@H](NC(=O)[C@H](NC(=O)CNC(=O)[C@@H](NC(=O)[C@H](NC(=O)[C@@H](NC(=O)[C@@H](NC(=O)CNC4=O)CCCN)CC(=O)O)C)CC(=O)O)CO)[C@H](C)CC(=O)O)CC(=O)c5ccccc5N)C)/C

Properties
Chemical formula	C_{77}H_{101}N_{17}O_{26}
Molar mass	1680.748 g·mol^{−1}
- Except where otherwise noted, data are given for materials in their standard state (at 25 °C [77 °F], 100 kPa). Infobox references

Surotomycin was an investigational oral antibiotic. This macrolide antibiotic was under investigation by Merck & Co (who acquired Cubist Pharmaceuticals) for the treatment of life-threatening diarrhea, commonly caused by the bacterium Clostridioides difficile. After reaching phase III in clinical trials, its production was discontinued in 2017 due to its non-superiority to current therapies.

== See also ==
- Cadazolid
- Fidaxomicin
- Ridinilazole
- SCHEMBL19952957
