= Asanoa endophytica =

Scientific classification
- Domain: Bacteria
- Kingdom: Bacillati
- Phylum: Actinomycetota
- Class: Actinomycetes
- Order: Micromonosporales
- Family: Micromonosporaceae
- Genus: Asanoa
- Species: A. endophytica

Binomial name
- Asanoa endophytica Niemhom et al. 2016

Type strain
- BR3-1; BCC 66355; NBRC 110002

Species of bacterium

Asanoa endophytica is a Gram-positive and non-motile bacterium from the genus Asanoa which has been isolated from the rhizome of the plant Boesenbergia rotunda.
