= Dactylosporangium solaniradicis =

Scientific classification
- Domain: Bacteria
- Kingdom: Bacillati
- Phylum: Actinomycetota
- Class: Actinomycetes
- Order: Micromonosporales
- Family: Micromonosporaceae
- Genus: Dactylosporangium
- Species: D. solaniradicis

Binomial name
- Dactylosporangium solaniradicis Fan et al. 2016

Type strain
- CGMCC 4.7302; DSM 100814; NEAU-FJL2

Species of bacterium

Dactylosporangium solaniradicis is a bacterium from the genus Dactylosporangium which has been isolated from roots of the tomato plant Solanum lycopersicum from a farm in Xiangfang, China.
