= Micromonospora fluostatini =

Scientific classification
- Domain: Bacteria
- Kingdom: Bacillati
- Phylum: Actinomycetota
- Class: Actinomycetia
- Order: Micromonosporales
- Family: Micromonosporaceae
- Genus: Micromonospora
- Species: M. fluostatini

Binomial name
- Micromonospora fluostatini Phongsopitanun et al. 2015

Type strain
- JCM 30529; PWB-003; PCU 341; TISTR 2345

Species of bacterium

Micromonospora fluostatini is a bacterium from the genus Micromonospora which has been isolated from marine sediments from Panwa Cape, Phuket Province, Thailand. Micromonospora fluostatini produces the antibiotics fluostatin B and fluostatin C
