= Dactylosporangium maewongense =

Scientific classification
- Domain: Bacteria
- Kingdom: Bacillati
- Phylum: Actinomycetota
- Class: Actinomycetes
- Order: Micromonosporales
- Family: Micromonosporaceae
- Genus: Dactylosporangium
- Species: D. maewongense

Binomial name
- Dactylosporangium maewongense Chiaraphongphon et al. 2010

Type strain
- BCC 34832; MW2-25; JCM 15933

Species of bacterium

Dactylosporangium maewongense is a bacterium from the genus Dactylosporangium which has been isolated from soil from the Mae Wong National Park, Thailand.
