= Micromonospora soli =

Scientific classification
- Domain: Bacteria
- Kingdom: Bacillati
- Phylum: Actinomycetota
- Class: Actinomycetia
- Order: Micromonosporales
- Family: Micromonosporaceae
- Genus: Micromonospora
- Species: M. soli

Binomial name
- Micromonospora soli Thawai et al. 2016

Type strain
- BCC 67268; SL3-70; NBRC 110009

Species of bacterium

Micromonospora soli is a bacterium from the genus Micromonospora which has been isolated from rhizosphere soil from a rice field.
