= Asanoa hainanensis =

Scientific classification
- Domain: Bacteria
- Kingdom: Bacillati
- Phylum: Actinomycetota
- Class: Actinomycetes
- Order: Micromonosporales
- Family: Micromonosporaceae
- Genus: Asanoa
- Species: A. hainanensis

Binomial name
- Asanoa hainanensis Xu et al. 2011

Type strain
- 210121; CGMCC 4.5593; DSM 45427

Species of bacterium

Asanoa hainanensis is a Gram-positive and non-motile bacterium from the genus Asanoa which has been isolated from the rhizospheric soil of the fern Acrostichum speciosum from Wenchang, China.
