= Dactylosporangium luridum =

Scientific classification
- Domain: Bacteria
- Kingdom: Bacillati
- Phylum: Actinomycetota
- Class: Actinomycetes
- Order: Micromonosporales
- Family: Micromonosporaceae
- Genus: Dactylosporangium
- Species: D. luridum

Binomial name
- Dactylosporangium luridum Kim et al. 2010

Type strain
- BK63; DSM 45324; KACC 20933; NRRL B-24775

Species of bacterium

Dactylosporangium luridum is a bacterium from the genus Dactylosporangium which has been isolated from soil from a hay meadow from the Cockle Park Experimental Farm, Northumberland, England.
