= Micromonospora taraxaci =

Scientific classification
- Domain: Bacteria
- Kingdom: Bacillati
- Phylum: Actinomycetota
- Class: Actinomycetia
- Order: Micromonosporales
- Family: Micromonosporaceae
- Genus: Micromonospora
- Species: M. taraxaci

Binomial name
- Micromonospora taraxaci Zhao et al. 2015

Type strain
- CGMCC 4.7098; DSM 45885; NEAU-P5

Species of bacterium

Micromonospora taraxaci is a bacterium from the genus Micromonospora which has been isolated from the roots of the plant Taraxacum mongolicum in Harbin, China.
