= Micromonospora chokoriensis =

Scientific classification
- Domain: Bacteria
- Kingdom: Bacillati
- Phylum: Actinomycetota
- Class: Actinomycetia
- Order: Micromonosporales
- Family: Micromonosporaceae
- Genus: Micromonospora
- Species: M. chokoriensis

Binomial name
- Micromonospora chokoriensis Ara and Kudo 2007

Type strain
- 2-19(6); DSM 45160; JCM 13247; MTCC 8535

Species of bacterium

Micromonospora chokoriensis is an endophytic actinomycete first isolated from sandy soil in Bangladesh; it produces single, non-motile nodular spore surfaces.
