= Virgisporangium ochraceum =

Scientific classification
- Domain: Bacteria
- Kingdom: Bacillati
- Phylum: Actinomycetota
- Class: Actinomycetes
- Order: Micromonosporales
- Family: Micromonosporaceae
- Genus: Virgisporangium
- Species: V. ochraceum

Binomial name
- Virgisporangium ochraceum corrig. Tamura et al. 2001

Type strain
- CIP 107213; DSM 44793; IFO 16418; JCM 11001; NBRC 16418; YU655-43

Synonyms
- Virgosporangium ochraceum Tamura et al. 2001

Species of bacterium

Virgisporangium ochraceum is a species of bacteria. It is a motile and spored species found in soil.
