= Dactylosporangium darangshiense =

Scientific classification
- Domain: Bacteria
- Kingdom: Bacillati
- Phylum: Actinomycetota
- Class: Actinomycetes
- Order: Micromonosporales
- Family: Micromonosporaceae
- Genus: Dactylosporangium
- Species: D. darangshiense

Binomial name
- Dactylosporangium darangshiense Seo and Lee 2010

Type strain
- DLS-44; DSM 45260; JCM 17441; KCTC 19560

Species of bacterium

Dactylosporangium darangshiense is a bacterium from the genus Dactylosporangium which has been isolated from rock soil from the Darangshi Oreum mountain in Korea.
