= Asanoa siamensis =

Scientific classification
- Domain: Bacteria
- Kingdom: Bacillati
- Phylum: Actinomycetota
- Class: Actinomycetes
- Order: Micromonosporales
- Family: Micromonosporaceae
- Genus: Asanoa
- Species: A. siamensis

Binomial name
- Asanoa siamensis Niemhom et al. 2013

Type strain
- PS7-2; BCC 41921; NBRC 107932

Species of bacterium

Asanoa siamensis is a bacterium from the genus Asanoa which has been isolated from soil from the peat swamp forest from the Phu Sang National Park, Thailand.
