= Micromonospora terminaliae =

Scientific classification
- Domain: Bacteria
- Kingdom: Bacillati
- Phylum: Actinomycetota
- Class: Actinomycetia
- Order: Micromonosporales
- Family: Micromonosporaceae
- Genus: Micromonospora
- Species: M. terminaliae

Binomial name
- Micromonospora terminaliae Kaewkla et al. 2017

Type strain
- DSM 101760; NRRL B-65345; TMS7

Species of bacterium

Micromonospora terminaliae is a bacterium from the genus Micromonospora which has been isolated from the stem of the plant Terminalia mucronata from Ubon Ratchathani, Thailand.
