= Streptomyces luridus =

Scientific classification
- Domain: Bacteria
- Kingdom: Bacillati
- Phylum: Actinomycetota
- Class: Actinomycetia
- Order: Streptomycetales
- Family: Streptomycetaceae
- Genus: Streptomyces
- Species: S. luridus

Binomial name
- Streptomyces luridus (Krassilnikov et al. 1957) Waksman 1961 (Approved Lists 1980)

Type strain
- AS 4.1458, ATCC 19782, BCRC 13684, CBS 534.68, CCRC 13684, CGMCC 4.1458, DSM 40081, IFO 12793, INMI 111, ISP 5081, JCM 4591, KCC S-0591, Lanoot R-8731, LMG 19365, NBRC 12793, NRRL B-5409, NRRL-ISP 5081, ptcc1134, R-8731, RIA 1061, UNIQEM 168, VKM Ac-245, VKM Ac-737, VLM Ac-245

Synonyms
- "Actinomyces luridus" Krassilnikov et al. 1957

Species of bacterium

Streptomyces luridus is a bacterium species from the genus of Streptomyces. Streptomyces luridus produces luridin.

== See also ==
- List of Streptomyces species
