= Longispora albida =

Scientific classification
- Domain: Bacteria
- Kingdom: Bacillati
- Phylum: Actinomycetota
- Class: Actinomycetes
- Order: Micromonosporales
- Family: Micromonosporaceae
- Genus: Longispora
- Species: L. albida

Binomial name
- Longispora albida Matsumoto et al. 2003

Type strain
- DSM 44784; JCM 11711; NBRC 100759; NRRL B-24201; K97-0003

Species of bacterium

Longispora albida is a bacterium from the genus Longispora which has been isolated from soil in Tokyo, Japan.
