= Micromonospora parathelypteridis =

Scientific classification
- Domain: Bacteria
- Kingdom: Bacillati
- Phylum: Actinomycetota
- Class: Actinomycetia
- Order: Micromonosporales
- Family: Micromonosporaceae
- Genus: Micromonospora
- Species: M. parathelypteridis

Binomial name
- Micromonospora parathelypteridis Zhao et al. 2017

Type strain
- CGMCC 4.7347; DSM 103125; NEAU-JXY5

Species of bacterium

Micromonospora parathelypteridis is a bacterium from the genus Micromonospora which has been isolated from the roots of the plant Parathelypteris beddomei in Harbin, China. Micromonospora parathelypteridis has antifungal activity
