= Phytohabitans kaempferiae =

Scientific classification
- Domain: Bacteria
- Kingdom: Bacillati
- Phylum: Actinomycetota
- Class: Actinomycetes
- Order: Micromonosporales
- Family: Micromonosporaceae
- Genus: Phytohabitans
- Species: P. kaempferiae

Binomial name
- Phytohabitans kaempferiae Niemhom et al. 2016

Type strain
- BCC 66360; NBRC 110005; KK1-3

Species of bacterium

Phytohabitans kaempferiae is a bacterium from the genus Phytohabitans which has been isolated from a leaf of the plant Kaempferia larsenii in Ubon Ratchathani province, Thailand.
