= Micromonospora ovatispora =

Scientific classification
- Domain: Bacteria
- Kingdom: Bacillati
- Phylum: Actinomycetota
- Class: Actinomycetia
- Order: Micromonosporales
- Family: Micromonosporaceae
- Genus: Micromonospora
- Species: M. ovatispora

Binomial name
- Micromonospora ovatispora Li and Hong 2016

Type strain
- CCTCC AA 2012009; DSM 45759; 270106; 2701SIM06

Species of bacterium

Micromonospora ovatispora is a bacterium from the genus Micromonospora which has been isolated from mangrove soil in Sanya, China.
