= Dactylosporangium cerinum =

Scientific classification
- Domain: Bacteria
- Kingdom: Bacillati
- Phylum: Actinomycetota
- Class: Actinomycetes
- Order: Micromonosporales
- Family: Micromonosporaceae
- Genus: Dactylosporangium
- Species: D. cerinum

Binomial name
- Dactylosporangium cerinum Liu et al. 2015

Type strain
- CGMCC 4.7152; DSM 46712; NEAU-TPG4

Species of bacterium

Dactylosporangium cerinum is a bacterium from the genus Dactylosporangium which has been isolated from rhizosphere soil of the tree Pinus koraiensis in Luobei, China.
