= Ishikariensis =

Ishikariensis may refer to:

- Asanoa ishikariensis, species of bacteria
- Typhula ishikariensis, species of fungus
