= Actinocatenispora sera =

Scientific classification
- Domain: Bacteria
- Kingdom: Bacillati
- Phylum: Actinomycetota
- Class: Actinomycetes
- Order: Micromonosporales
- Family: Micromonosporaceae
- Genus: Actinocatenispora
- Species: A. sera

Binomial name
- Actinocatenispora sera Matsumoto et al. 2007

Type strain
- JCM 15920; KV-744; DSM 45336; NBRC 101916; NRRL B-24477

Species of bacterium

Actinocatenispora sera is a bacterium from the genus Actinocatenispora which has been isolated from soil in Niigata, Japan.
