= Micromonospora echinaurantiaca =

Scientific classification
- Domain: Bacteria
- Kingdom: Bacillati
- Phylum: Actinomycetota
- Class: Actinomycetes
- Order: Micromonosporales
- Family: Micromonosporaceae
- Genus: Micromonospora
- Species: M. echinaurantiaca

Binomial name
- Micromonospora echinaurantiaca Kroppenstedt et al. 2005

Type strain
- ATCC 35572; DSM 43904; IFO 14022; JCM 3257; NBRC 14022; NRRL B-16102

Species of bacterium

Micromonospora echinaurantiaca is a species of endophytic actinomycete bacteria.
