= Virgisporangium aurantiacum =

Scientific classification
- Domain: Bacteria
- Kingdom: Bacillati
- Phylum: Actinomycetota
- Class: Actinomycetes
- Order: Micromonosporales
- Family: Micromonosporaceae
- Genus: Virgisporangium
- Species: V. aurantiacum

Binomial name
- Virgisporangium aurantiacum corrig. Tamura et al. 2001

Type strain
- CIP 107212; DSM 44794; IFO 16421; JCM 11002; NBRC 16421; YU438-5

Synonyms
- Virgosporangium aurantiacum Tamura et al. 2001

Species of bacterium

Virgisporangium aurantiacum is a species of bacteria. It is a motile and spored species found in soil.
