= Micromonospora citrea =

Scientific classification
- Domain: Bacteria
- Kingdom: Bacillati
- Phylum: Actinomycetota
- Class: Actinomycetia
- Order: Micromonosporales
- Family: Micromonosporaceae
- Genus: Micromonospora
- Species: M. citrea

Binomial name
- Micromonospora citrea Kroppenstedt et al. 2005

Type strain
- ATCC 35571; DSM 43903; IFO 14025; JCM 3256; NBRC 14025; NRRL B-16101

Species of bacterium

Micromonospora citrea is an endophytic actinomycete. It produces citreamicins, several types of antibacterial antibiotics.
