= Dactylosporangium sucinum =

Scientific classification
- Domain: Bacteria
- Kingdom: Bacillati
- Phylum: Actinomycetota
- Class: Actinomycetes
- Order: Micromonosporales
- Family: Micromonosporaceae
- Genus: Dactylosporangium
- Species: D. sucinum

Binomial name
- Dactylosporangium sucinum Phongsopitanun et al. 2016

Type strain
- RY35-23; JCM 19831; PCU 333; TISTR 2212

Species of bacterium

Dactylosporangium sucinum is a bacterium from the genus Dactylosporangium which has been isolated from peat swamp forest soil in Thailand.
