= Micromonospora sediminis =

Scientific classification
- Domain: Bacteria
- Kingdom: Bacillati
- Phylum: Actinomycetota
- Class: Actinomycetes
- Order: Micromonosporales
- Family: Micromonosporaceae
- Genus: Micromonospora
- Species: M. sediminis

Binomial name
- Micromonospora sediminis Phongsopitanun et al. 2016

Type strain
- JCM 18523; CH3-3; PCU 350; TISTR 2396

Species of bacterium

Micromonospora sediminis is a bacterium from the genus Micromonospora which has been isolated from mangrove sediments from Chonburi Province, Thailand.
