= Actinocatenispora thailandica =

Scientific classification
- Domain: Bacteria
- Kingdom: Bacillati
- Phylum: Actinomycetota
- Class: Actinomycetes
- Order: Micromonosporales
- Family: Micromonosporaceae
- Genus: Actinocatenispora
- Species: A. thailandica

Binomial name
- Actinocatenispora thailandica Thawai et al. 2006

Type strain
- BCRC 16831; CGMCC 4.5560; CIP 109347; DSM 44816; JCM 12343; PCU 235; TT2-10

Species of bacterium

Actinocatenispora thailandica is a bacterium from the genus Actinocatenispora which has been isolated from soil in Thailand.
