= Tiacumicin =

Family of antibiotics

Tiacumicins are a family of macrolide antibiotics derived from Dactylosporangium aurantiacum subspecies hamdenesis subspecies Nov. The tiacumicin family of antibiotics has substantial overlap with the clostomicin family.

Six 18-membered antibiotics in the tiacumicin family have been identified: tiacumicins A through F. Currently, only one of these, tiacumicin B (also lipiarmycin, clostomicin B1) is commercially available, under the generic name fidaxomicin.
