= Allocatelliglobosispora scoriae =

Scientific classification
- Domain: Bacteria
- Kingdom: Bacillati
- Phylum: Actinomycetota
- Class: Actinomycetes
- Order: Micromonosporales
- Family: Micromonosporaceae
- Genus: Allocatelliglobosispora; Lee and Lee 2011
- Species: A. scoriae

Binomial name
- Allocatelliglobosispora scoriae Lee and Lee 2011

Type strain
- DSM 45362; KCTC 19661; Sco-B14

Species of bacterium

Allocatelliglobosispora scoriae is a non-motile bacterium from the genus Allocatelliglobosispora which has been isolated from volcanic ash in Jeju, Korea.
