= Asanoa =

Scientific classification
- Domain: Bacteria
- Kingdom: Bacillati
- Phylum: Actinomycetota
- Class: Actinomycetes
- Order: Micromonosporales
- Family: Micromonosporaceae
- Genus: Asanoa; Lee and Hah 2002

Type species
- Asanoa ferruginea (Asano and Kawamoto 1986) Lee and Hah 2002

Species
- A. endophytica Niemhom et al. 2016; A. ferruginea (Asano and Kawamoto 1986) Lee and Hah 2002; A. hainanensis Xu et al. 2011; A. iriomotensis Tamura and Sakane 2005; A. ishikariensis Lee and Hah 2002; A. siamensis Niemhom et al. 2013

Genus of bacteria

Asanoa is a Gram-positive, aerobic, mesophilic and non-motile genus of bacteria from the family Micromonosporaceae. Asanoa is named after the Japanese microbiologist Kozo Asano.
