= Actinocatenispora =

Scientific classification
- Domain: Bacteria
- Kingdom: Bacillati
- Phylum: Actinomycetota
- Class: Actinomycetes
- Order: Micromonosporales
- Family: Micromonosporaceae
- Genus: Actinocatenispora; Thawai et al. 2006

Type species
- Actinocatenispora thailandica Thawai et al. 2006

Species
- A. comari; A. rupis; A. sera; A. thailandica

Genus of bacteria

Actinocatenispora is a genus in the phylum Actinomycetota (Bacteria).

== Etymology ==
The name Actinocatenispora derives from Greek noun aktis, aktinos (ἀκτίς, ἀκτῖνος), a beam, ray; Latin noun catena, chain; Greek feminine gender noun spora (σπορά), seed, and in biology a spore; resulting in Neo-Latin feminine gender noun Actinocatenispora, spore chain-producing ray (fungus).

- A. rupis (Latin genitive case noun rupis, of a cliff, referring to the site from which the type strain was isolated.)
- A. sera (Latin feminine gender adjective sera, late.)
- A. thailandica (Neo-Latin feminine gender adjective thailandica, of or belonging to Thailand, where the type strain was isolated.)

== Phylogeny ==
The currently accepted taxonomy is based on the List of Prokaryotic names with Standing in Nomenclature (LPSN) and National Center for Biotechnology Information (NCBI).

16S rRNA based LTP_10_2024 and 120 marker proteins based GTDB 10-RS226

- Actinocatenispora
  - A. rupis Seo and Lee 2009
  - - A. thailandica Thawai et al. 2006
    - - A. comari Oyunbileg et al. 2021
      - A. sera Matsumoto et al. 2007

== See also ==
- Bacterial taxonomy
- List of bacterial orders
- List of bacteria genera
- Microbiology
