= Asanoa ishikariensis =

Scientific classification
- Domain: Bacteria
- Kingdom: Bacillati
- Phylum: Actinomycetota
- Class: Actinomycetes
- Order: Micromonosporales
- Family: Micromonosporaceae
- Genus: Asanoa
- Species: A. ishikariensis

Binomial name
- Asanoa ishikariensis Lee and Hah 2002

Type strain
- DSM 44718; IFO 14551; IMSNU 22004; JCM 11895; NBRC 14551; 6432-C

Synonyms
- "Catellatospora ishikariense" Asano

Species of bacterium

Asanoa ishikariensis is a bacterium from the genus Asanoa which has been isolated from soil in Japan.
