= Catelliglobosispora koreensis =

Scientific classification
- Domain: Bacteria
- Kingdom: Bacillati
- Phylum: Actinomycetota
- Class: Actinomycetia
- Order: Micromonosporales
- Family: Micromonosporaceae
- Genus: Catelliglobosispora; Ara et al. 2008
- Species: C. koreensis

Binomial name
- Catelliglobosispora koreensis Lee et al. 2000

Type strain
- CIP 107020; DSM 44566; IMSNU 50729; JCM 10976; LM 042

Synonyms
- Catellatospora koreensis Lee et al. 2000

Genus of bacteria

Catelliglobosispora koreensis is a species of bacteria from the family Micromonosporaceae. Catelliglobosispora koreensis has been isolated from soil from a gold mine cave from Kongju in Korea.
