= Krasilnikovia cinnamomea =

Scientific classification
- Domain: Bacteria
- Kingdom: Bacillati
- Phylum: Actinomycetota
- Class: Actinomycetes
- Order: Micromonosporales
- Family: Micromonosporaceae
- Genus: Krasilnikovia corrig. Ara and Kudo 2007
- Species: K. cinnamomea

Binomial name
- Krasilnikovia cinnamomea corrig. Ara and Kudo 2007

Type strain
- 3-54(41); DSM 45162; JCM 13252; MTCC 8094

Synonyms
- Krasilnikovia cinnamonea Ara and Kudo 2007

Species of bacterium

Krasilnikovia cinnamomea is a bacterium species in the genus Krasilnikovia.

== Nomenclature ==
The genus is named after Russian microbiologist Nikolai Aleksandrovich Krasil'nikov (1896–1973). The species epithet, cinnamomea, is a New Latin adjective meaning cinnamon-colored.
