= Virgisporangium =

Scientific classification
- Domain: Bacteria
- Kingdom: Bacillati
- Phylum: Actinomycetota
- Class: Actinomycetes
- Order: Micromonosporales
- Family: Micromonosporaceae
- Genus: Virgisporangium corrig. Tamura et al. 2001

Type species
- Virgisporangium ochraceum corrig. Tamura et al. 2001

Species
- V. aliadipatigenens Otoguro et al. 2011; V. aurantiacum corrig. Tamura et al. 2001; V. myanmarense Yamamura et al. 2018; V. ochraceum corrig. Tamura et al. 2001

Synonyms
- Virgosporangium Tamura et al. 2001

Genus of bacteria

Virgisporangium is a genus of gram-positive bacteria. Virgisporangium are rod-shaped, motile, and form spores. They require oxygen to survive. They are generally found in the soil.
