= Salinispora tropica =

Scientific classification
- Domain: Bacteria
- Kingdom: Bacillati
- Phylum: Actinomycetota
- Class: Actinomycetes
- Order: Micromonosporales
- Family: Micromonosporaceae
- Genus: Salinispora
- Species: S. tropica

Binomial name
- Salinispora tropica Maldonado et al. 2005

Type strain
- ATCC BAA-916; CNB-440; DSM 44818; JCM 13857

Species of bacterium

Salinispora tropica is an obligate marine actinomycete bacterium species. It produces salinosporamide A and salinosporamide B, potential anti-cancer agents, as well as the polycyclic macrolides sporolide A and B.

== See also ==
- Salinispora arenicola
- Salinispora pacifica
