= Allorhizocola rhizosphaerae =

Scientific classification
- Domain: Bacteria
- Kingdom: Bacillati
- Phylum: Actinomycetota
- Class: Actinomycetes
- Order: Micromonosporales
- Family: Micromonosporaceae
- Genus: Allorhizocola; Sun et al. 2019
- Species: A. rhizosphaerae

Binomial name
- Allorhizocola rhizosphaerae Sun et al. 2019

Type strain
- CPCC 204380; DSM 102292; KCTC 39746

Genus of bacteria

Allorhizocola rhizosphaerae is a species of bacteria from the family Micromonosporaceae which has been isolated from rhizospheric soil from the plant Calligonum mongolicum from the Xinjiang Province.
