= Dactylosporangium =

Scientific classification
- Domain: Bacteria
- Kingdom: Bacillati
- Phylum: Actinomycetota
- Class: Actinomycetes
- Order: Micromonosporales
- Family: Micromonosporaceae
- Genus: Dactylosporangium; Thiemann et al. 1967 (Approved Lists 1980)

Type species
- Dactylosporangium aurantiacum Thiemann et al. 1967 (Approved Lists 1980)

Species
- See text.

Genus of bacteria

Dactylosporangium is a genus of bacteria in the phylum Actinomycetota.

== Etymology ==
The name Dactylosporangium derives from:
Greek noun daktulos, finger; Greek noun spora (σπορά), a seed, and in biology a spore; Greek neuter gender noun angeion (Latin transliteration angium), vessel; Neo-Latin neuter gender noun Dactylosporangium an organism with finger-shaped, spore-containing vessels (sporangia).

== Species ==
The genus Dactylosporangium comprises the following species:

- D. aurantiacum Thiemann et al. 1967 (Approved Lists 1980) (Neo-Latin neuter gender adjective aurantiacum, orange colored.)
- D. cerinum Liu et al. 2015
- D. darangshiense Seo and Lee 2010 (Neo-Latin neuter gender adjective darangshiense, of or pertaining to Darangshi, referring to Darangshi Oreum in Jeju, Republic of Korea, the site from which the type strain was isolated.)
- D. fulvum Shomura et al. 1986 (Latin neuter gender adjective fulvum, deep yellow, tawny, yellowish brown, referring to the color of the vegetative mycelium.)
- D. luridum Kim et al. 2010 (Latin neuter gender adjective luridum, pale yellow.)
- D. luteum Kim et al. 2010 (Latin neuter gender adjective luteum, orange–yellow, flame-coloured.)
- D. maewongense Chiaraphongphon et al. 2010 (Neo-Latin neuter gender adjective maewongense, pertaining to Maewong National Park, where the type strain was isolated.)
- D. matsuzakiense Shomura and Niida 1983 (Neo-Latin neuter gender adjective matsuzakiense, of or pertaining to Matsuzaki-cho, Izu Peninsula, Japan.)
- D. roseum Shomura et al. 1985 (Latin neuter gender adjective roseum, rose colored, pink.)
- D. salmoneum (ex Celmer et al. 1978) Kim et al. 2010 (Latin noun salmo -onis, salmon; Latin adjective suff. -eus -a -um, suffix used with various meanings; Neo-Latin neuter gender adjective salmoneum, salmon-coloured.)
- D. siamense Thawai and Suriyachadkun 2013
- D. solaniradicis Fan et al. 2016
- D. sucinum Phongsopitanun et al. 2016
- D. thailandense Thiemann et al. 1967 (Approved Lists 1980) (Neo-Latin neuter gender adjective thailandense, of or pertaining to Thailand.)
- D. tropicum Thawai et al. 2011
- D. vinaceum Shomura et al. 1983 (Latin neuter gender adjective vinaceum, of or belonging to wine, intended to mean wine colored.)

== See also ==
- Bacterial taxonomy
- Microbiology
