= Actinorhabdospora filicis =

Scientific classification
- Domain: Bacteria
- Kingdom: Bacillati
- Phylum: Actinomycetota
- Class: Actinomycetes
- Order: Micromonosporales
- Family: Micromonosporaceae
- Genus: Actinorhabdospora; Mingma et al. 2016
- Species: A. filicis

Binomial name
- Actinorhabdospora filicis Mingma et al. 2016

Type strain
- K12-0408; NBRC 111897; TBRC 5327

Species of bacterium

Actinorhabdospora filicis is a bacterium from the genus Actinorhabdospora which has been isolated from soil in Tokyo, Japan.
