= Hamadaea =

Scientific classification
- Domain: Bacteria
- Kingdom: Bacillati
- Phylum: Actinomycetota
- Class: Actinomycetes
- Order: Micromonosporales
- Family: Micromonosporaceae
- Genus: Hamadaea; Ara et al. 2008

Type species
- Hamadaea tsunoensis (Asano et al. 1989) Ara et al. 2008

Species
- H. flava Chu et al. 2016; H. tsunoensis (Asano et al. 1989) Ara et al. 2008

Genus of bacteria

Hamadaea is a genus of bacteria from the family Micromonosporaceae. Hamadaea is named after the Japanese microbiologist Masa Hamada.
