= Plantactinospora =

Scientific classification
- Domain: Bacteria
- Kingdom: Bacillati
- Phylum: Actinomycetota
- Class: Actinomycetes
- Order: Micromonosporales
- Family: Micromonosporaceae
- Genus: Plantactinospora; Qin et al. 2009

Type species
- Plantactinospora mayteni Qin et al. 2009

Species
- Plantactinospora endophytica Zhu et al. 2012; Plantactinospora mayteni Qin et al. 2009; Plantactinospora siamensis (Thawai et al. 2010) Zhu et al. 2012; Plantactinospora solaniradicis Li et al. 2018; Plantactinospora sonchi Ma et al. 2015; Plantactinospora soyae Guo et al. 2016; Plantactinospora veratri Xing et al. 2015

Synonyms
- Actinaurispora Thawai et al. 2010

Genus of bacteria

Plantactinospora is a genus in the phylum Actinomycetota (Bacteria).
