= Phytohabitans =

Scientific classification
- Domain: Bacteria
- Kingdom: Bacillati
- Phylum: Actinomycetota
- Class: Actinomycetes
- Order: Micromonosporales
- Family: Micromonosporaceae
- Genus: Phytohabitans; Inahashi et al. 2010

Type species
- Phytohabitans suffuscus Inahashi et al. 2010

Species
- P. flavus Inahashi et al. 2012; P. houttuyneae Inahashi et al. 2012; P. kaempferiae Niemhom et al. 2016; P. rumicis Inahashi et al. 2012; P. suffuscus Inahashi et al. 2010

Genus of bacteria

Phytohabitans is a Gram-positive, aerobic, mesophilic and non-motile genus of bacteria from the family Micromonosporaceae.
