= Longispora =

Scientific classification
- Domain: Bacteria
- Kingdom: Bacillati
- Phylum: Actinomycetota
- Class: Actinomycetes
- Order: Micromonosporales
- Family: Micromonosporaceae
- Genus: Longispora; Matsumoto et al. 2003

Type species
- Longispora albida Matsumoto et al. 2003

Species
- L. albida Matsumoto et al. 2003; L. fulva Shiratori-Takano et al. 2011; L. urticae Piao et al. 2017

Genus of bacteria

Longispora is a Gram-positive, aerobic and non-motile genus of bacteria from the family Micromonosporaceae.
