= Luedemannella =

Scientific classification
- Domain: Bacteria
- Kingdom: Bacillati
- Phylum: Actinomycetota
- Class: Actinomycetes
- Order: Micromonosporales
- Family: Micromonosporaceae
- Genus: Luedemannella; Ara and Kudo 2007

Type species
- Luedemannella helvata Ara and Kudo 2007

Species
- L. flava Ara and Kudo 2007; L. helvata Ara and Kudo 2007

Genus of bacteria

Luedemannella is a Gram-positive, aerobic and non-motile genus of bacteria from the family Micromonosporaceae. Luedemannella is named after the Russian actinomycetologist George M. Luedemann.
