= Salinosporamide =

The salinosporamides are a group of closely related chemical compounds isolated from marine bacteria in the genus Salinispora. They possess a densely functionalized γ-lactam-β-lactone bicyclic core.

Salinosporamide A has attracted interest for its potential use in treating various types of cancer.

In addition, a variety of synthetic analogs have been prepared.

== Chemical structures ==
Salinosporamide A

Salinosporamide B

Salinosporamide C

Salinosporamide D

Salinosporamide E

Salinosporamide F

Salinosporamide G

Salinosporamide H

Salinosporamide I

Salinosporamide J

Salinosporamide K
