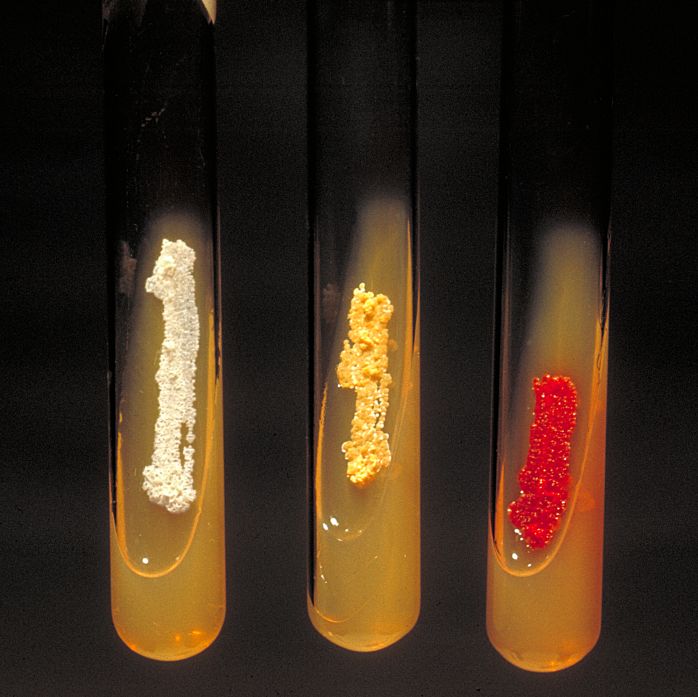
- Micromonospora spp. (red colonies) on sloped agar medium, alongside 2 other tubes with differently coloured bacterial colonies.

Scientific classification
- Domain: Bacteria
- Kingdom: Bacillati
- Phylum: Actinomycetota
- Class: Actinomycetes
- Order: Micromonosporales
- Family: Micromonosporaceae
- Genus: Micromonospora; Ørskov 1923 (Approved Lists 1980)

Type species
- Micromonospora chalcea Foulerton 1905; Ørskov 1923 (Approved Lists 1980)

Species
- See text.

Synonyms
- Jishengella Xie et al. 2011; Verrucosispora Rheims et al. 1998; Xiangella Wang et al. 2013

= Micromonospora =

Genus of bacteria

Micromonospora is a genus of bacteria of the family Micromonosporaceae. The genus name was first proposed in 1923 by Danish physician Jeppe Ørskov in an attempt to classify what at the time was considered "ray fungi" based on morphology. Members of this genus are found throughout natural soil and sediment environments, as well as in association with roots of plants of various species. The genus is well known for its ability to produce a variety of medically relevant products.

They are gram-positive, spore-forming, generally aerobic, and form a branched mycelium; they occur as saprotrophic forms in soil and water. Various species are sources of aminoglycoside antibiotics with spellings that end with -micin, such as gentamicin, mutamicin, netilmicin, retymicin, sisomicin, verdamicin, calicheamicin, and the recently found turbinmicin, unlike most other aminoglycoside names that end with -mycin (e.g. neomycin, tobramycin and streptomycin) and are produced by Streptomyces spp..

== Species ==
Micromonospora comprises the following species:

- M. acroterricola Carro et al. 2019
- M. andamanensis (Supong et al. 2013) Nouioui et al. 2018
- M. arida Carro et al. 2019
- M. aurantiaca Sveshnikova et al. 1969 (Approved Lists 1980)
- M. auratinigra corrig. Thawai et al. 2004
- M. avicenniae Li et al. 2013
- M. azadirachtae Kuncharoen et al. 2019
- M. caldifontis Thawai et al. 2019
- M. carbonacea Luedemann and Brodsky 1965 (Approved Lists 1980)
- "M. cellulolyticum" Lin et al. 1994
- M. chaiyaphumensis Jongrungruangchok et al. 2008
- M. chalcea (Foulerton 1905) Ørskov 1923 (Approved Lists 1980)
- M. chersina Tomita et al. 1992
- M. chokoriensis Ara and Kudo 2007
- M. citrea Kroppenstedt et al. 2005
- M. coerulea Jensen 1932 (Approved Lists 1980)
- M. coriariae Trujillo et al. 2006
- M. costi Thawai 2015
- M. coxensis Ara and Kudo 2007
- M. craniellae Li et al. 2019
- M. craterilacus Ay et al. 2020
- M. cremea Carro et al. 2012
- M. deserti Saygin et al. 2020
- M. eburnea Thawai et al. 2005
- M. echinaurantiaca Kroppenstedt et al. 2005
- M. echinofusca Kroppenstedt et al. 2005
- M. echinospora Luedemann and Brodsky 1964 (Approved Lists 1980)
- M. endolithica Hirsch et al. 2004
- "M. endophytica" Thanaboripat et al. 2015
- M. endophytica (Xie et al. 2011) Li et al. 2019
- M. equina Everest and Meyers 2013
- M. ferruginea Back et al. 2021
- M. fiedleri (Goodfellow et al. 2013) Nouioui et al. 2018
- M. fluminis Camacho Pozo et al. 2020
- M. fluostatini Phongsopitanun et al. 2015
- M. fulva Lee and Whang 2017
- M. fulviviridis Kroppenstedt et al. 2005
- M. gallica (Erikson 1935) Waksman 1961 (Approved Lists 1980)
- M. gifhornensis (Rheims et al. 1998) Nouioui et al. 2018
- M. globbae Kuncharoen et al. 2018
- M. globispora Carro et al. 2019
- M. haikouensis corrig. Xie et al. 2012
- M. halophytica Weinstein et al. 1968 (Approved Lists 1980)
- M. halotolerans Carro et al. 2013
- M. harpali Fang et al. 2015
- M. humi Songsumanus et al. 2011
- M. humida Ra et al. 2021
- M. inaquosa Carro et al. 2019
- M. inositola Kawamoto et al. 1974 (Approved Lists 1980)
- M. inyonensis Kroppenstedt et al. 2005
- "M. jinlongensis" Gao et al. 2014
- M. kangleipakensis Nimaichand et al. 2013
- M. krabiensis Jongrungruangchok et al. 2008
- M. lupini Trujillo et al. 2007
- M. lutea (Liao et al. 2009) Nouioui et al. 2018
- M. luteifusca Carro et al. 2017
- M. luteiviridis Carro et al. 2018
- "M. lycii" Zhao et al. 2016
- M. mangrovi Xie et al. 2016
- "M. maoerensis" Li et al. 2014
- M. marina Tanasupawat et al. 2010
- M. maris (Goodfellow et al. 2012) Nouioui et al. 2018
- M. maritima Songsumanus et al. 2013
- M. matsumotoense (Asano et al. 1989) Lee et al. 2000
- M. mirobrigensis Trujillo et al. 2005
- "M. miyakonensis" Kawamura et al. 1981
- M. musae Kuncharoen et al. 2021
- M. narathiwatensis Thawai et al. 2008
- "M. neihuensis" Wu et al. 1988
- M. nickelidurans Lin et al. 2015
- M. nigra (Weinstein et al. 1968) Kasai et al. 2000
- M. noduli Carro et al. 2016
- M. olivasterospora Kawamoto et al. 1983
- M. orduensis Veyisoglu et al. 2020
- M. oryzae Kittiwongwattana et al. 2015
- M. ovatispora Li and Hong 2016
- M. pallida (Luedemann and Brodsky 1964) Kasai et al. 2000
- M. palomenae Fang et al. 2015
- M. parathelypteridis Zhao et al. 2017
- M. pattaloongensis Thawai et al. 2008
- M. pelagivivens Intra et al. 2020
- M. peucetia Kroppenstedt et al. 2005
- M. phaseoli (Wang et al. 2013) Nouioui et al. 2018
- M. phytophila Carro et al. 2018
- M. pisi Garcia et al. 2010
- M. polyrhachis Xiang et al. 2014
- M. profundi Veyisoglu et al. 2016
- "M. provocatoris" Abdel-Mageed et al. 2021
- M. purpureochromogenes (Waksman and Curtis 1916) Luedemann 1971 (Approved Lists 1980)
- M. qiuiae (Xi et al. 2012) Nouioui et al. 2018
- M. radicis Kuncharoen et al. 2019
- M. rhizosphaerae Wang et al. 2011
- M. rifamycinica Huang et al. 2008
- M. rosaria (ex Wagman et al. 1972) Horan and Brodsky 1986
- "M. rosea" Gado et al. 1985
- "M. rubida" Sun et al. 2021
- M. saelicesensis Trujillo et al. 2007
- M. sagamiensis Kroppenstedt et al. 2005
- M. schwarzwaldensis Vela Gurovic et al. 2013
- M. sediminicola Supong et al. 2013
- M. sediminimaris Nouioui et al. 2018
- M. sediminis Phongsopitanun et al. 2016
- M. siamensis Thawai et al. 2006
- M. soli Thawai et al. 2016
- M. sonneratiae Li et al. 2013
- "M. spongicola" Supong et al. 2013
- M. tarapacensis Villalobos et al. 2021
- M. taraxaci Zhao et al. 2015
- M. terminaliae Kaewkla et al. 2017
- M. trujilloniae Nouioui et al. 2018
- M. tulbaghiae Kirby and Meyers 2010
- M. ureilytica Carro et al. 2016
- M. veneta Kaewkla et al. 2022
- "M. verruculosa" Tani et al. 1982
- M. vinacea Carro et al. 2016
- M. violae Zhang et al. 2014
- M. viridifaciens Kroppenstedt et al. 2005
- M. vulcania Jia et al. 2016
- M. wenchangensis Ren et al. 2013
- M. yangpuensis Zhang et al. 2012
- M. yasonensis Veyisoglu et al. 2017
- M. zamorensis Carro et al. 2012
- "M. zeae" Shen et al. 2014
- "M. zhangzhouensis" Fu et al. 2020
- M. zhanjiangensis Zhang et al. 2015
- M. zingiberis (Thawai et al. 2018) Kuncharoen et al. 2019
