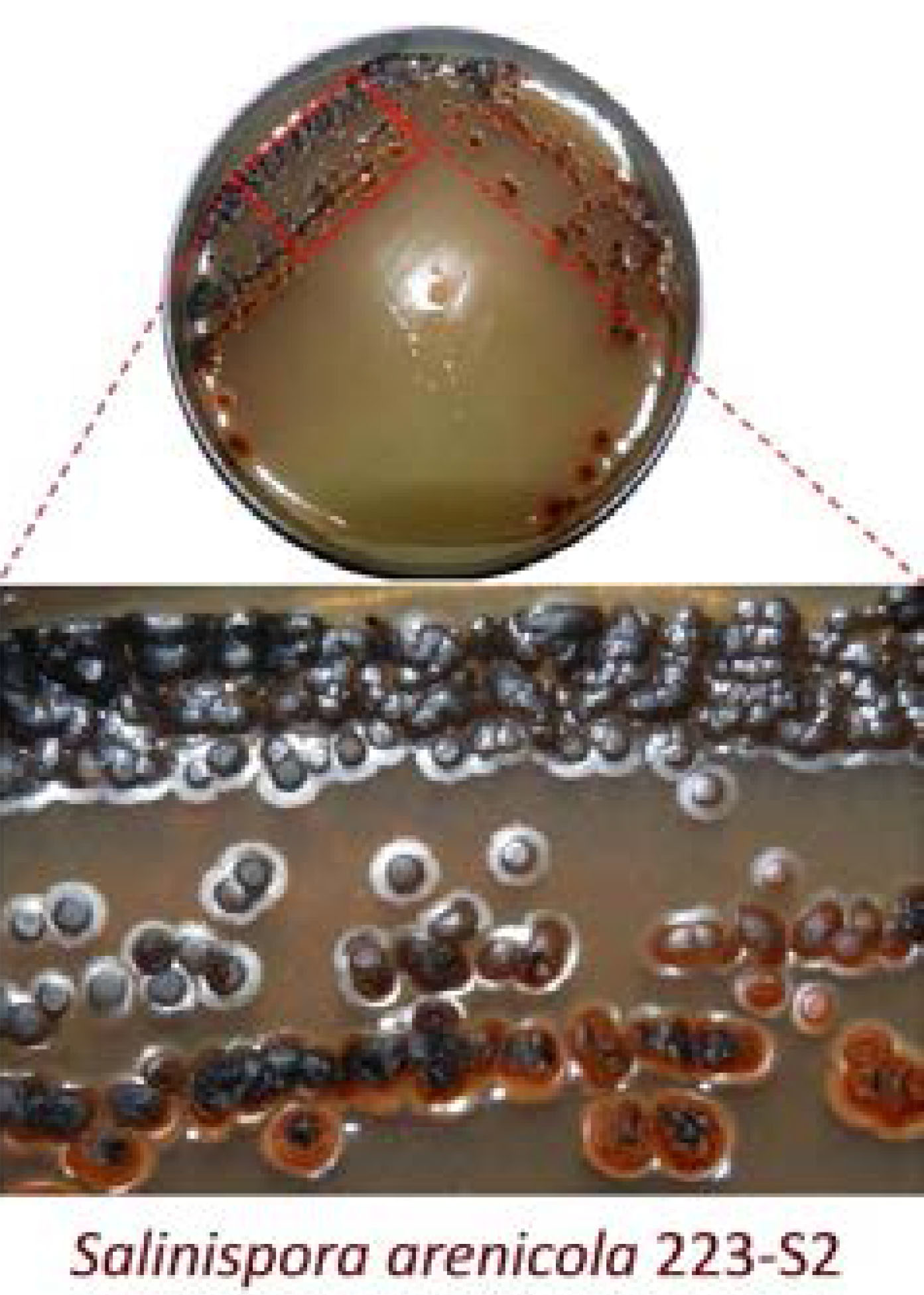
- S. arenicola strain TM223-S2

Scientific classification
- Domain: Bacteria
- Kingdom: Bacillati
- Phylum: Actinomycetota
- Class: Actinomycetes
- Order: Micromonosporales
- Family: Micromonosporaceae
- Genus: Salinispora; Maldonado et al. 2005

Type species
- Salinispora arenicola Maldonado et al. 2005

Species
- S. arenicola Maldonado et al. 2005; S. cortesiana Román-Ponce et al. 2020; S. fenicalii Román-Ponce et al. 2020; S. goodfellowii Román-Ponce et al. 2020; S. mooreana Román-Ponce et al. 2020; S. oceanensis Román-Ponce et al. 2020; S. pacifica Ahmed et al. 2014; S. tropica Maldonado et al. 2005; S. vitiensis Román-Ponce et al. 2020

= Salinispora =

Genus of bacteria

Salinispora is a genus of obligately aerobic, gram-positive, non-acid-fast bacteria belonging to the family of Micromonosporaceae. They are heterotrophic, non-motile, and obligately grow under high osmotic/ionic-strength conditions. They are the first identified genus of gram-positive bacteria which has a high osmotic/ionic-strength requirement for survival. They are widely abundant in tropical marine sediments and were first identified in 2002. This genus of bacteria has potential biotechnological significance due to their production of novel secondary metabolites which can be used pharmaceutically.

There are nine known species that fall within the genus of Salinispora including the better studied S. arenicola, S. tropica, and S. pacifica. The clade that initially comprised only S. pacifica was further interrogated through comparative genomic analyses in 2020 to reveal six additional species. The differentiation of these species is likely the result of niche differentiation rather than allopatric speciation due to the species co-occurrence. Despite there being high sequence similarity among Salinispora genomes (>99% 16S rRNA sequence identity), species- and strain-based differences among biosynthetic gene clusters and products have been determined.

== Characteristics ==
Salinispora members are gram-positive, filamentous bacteria which form extensively branched hyphae with smooth surfaced spores that can occur in clusters or singles. During sporulation, spores may disseminate from short spore-bearing protrusions (sporophores) or directly from the base (sessile). They produce a range of pigments including dark brown, black, orange, and pink. They likely spend a considerable amount of time in the resting stage as spores, with a much larger abundance and distribution of spores relative to growing individuals. They have been shown in culture to preferentially grow at the upper sediment layers where blooms at the sediment-seawater interface have been observed.

Salinispora is the first identified gram-positive bacterial genus which requires a high osmotic/ionic-strength environment to survive. However, it has been shown that sodium concentrations experienced in marine environments can be replaced with potassium and lithium. The required ionic-strength differs among Salinispora species, but is likely due to the loss of the mscL transporter in the cell membranes in all species.

Species and strains within Salinispora produce a wide variety of secondary metabolites. It is likely that the biosynthetic gene clusters producing these secondary metabolites were initially acquired via horizontal gene transfer, potentially explaining the high sequence similarity among species and strains. The wide array of different biosynthetic gene products may have also contributed to niche differentiation. The large production of species/strains' particular secondary metabolite lends evidence to the importance of them in bacterial survival, and can potentially be used to identify specific species and strains within the genus Salinispora.

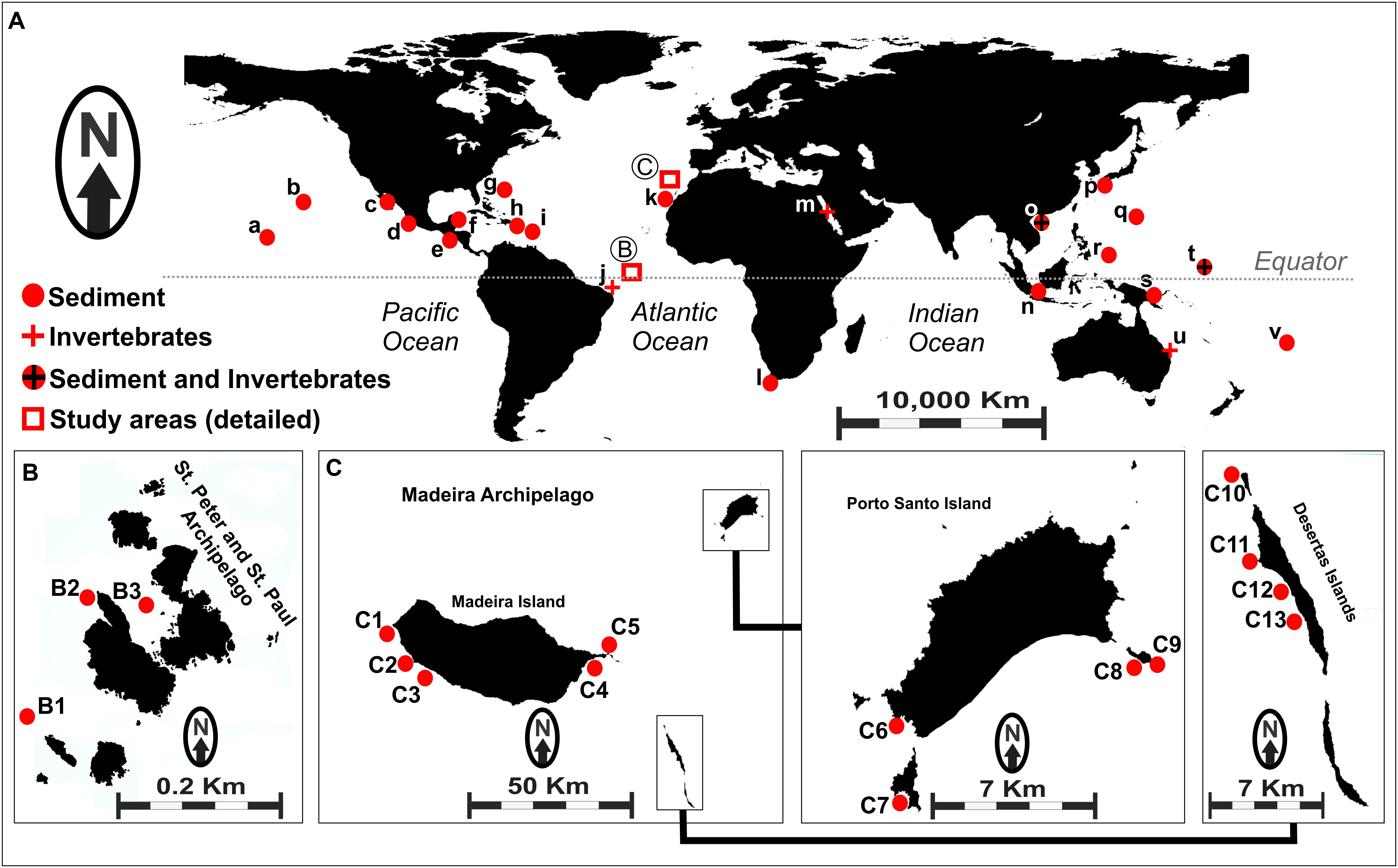
Current Salinispora sampling locations

== Distribution ==
Salinispora are commonly found in tropical and subtropical near-shore marine sediments of the Atlantic, Pacific, and Indian oceans. They have been detected at depths up to 5699 m (undetermined whether actively growing or spores) and confirmed to be growing at depths up to 1100 m. Whether their distribution may include higher latitudes or why they are limited to equatorial regions is not yet known. Additionally, their distribution may not be limited to sediments as they have also been isolated from sponges and seaweeds.

The majority of the S. tropica isolates have been isolated in the Caribbean while the rest have been identified in all three oceans, with S. arenicola being the most geographically abundant.

== Pharmaceutical significance ==
Salinispora has been used as a model for analyzing genome sequence data in order to further uncover biosynthetic pathways among bacteria. This has been an integral part of research into using microbial natural products as leads for the discovery of traditional natural products and potential new drugs. By viewing the evolutionary histories and diversity of the genus, researchers have been able to uncover mechanisms behind the strategies bacteria use to generate chemical diversity and produce diverse secondary metabolites. These various new secondary metabolites in Salinispora species have been identified as potentially pharmaceutically valuable. Salinispora species can be distinguished by the natural products that each species produces.

=== Salinispora arenicola secondary metabolites ===
Salinispora arenicola secondary metabolites have a broad range of pharmaceutical applications. There are over 20 natural compounds that can be isolated from Salinispora arenicola (e.g., arenamides, arenicolides, arenimycins or salinisporamycin). The potential applications for these compounds are extensive. Over nine compounds are related to cancer cells or cancer precursor inhibition; other compounds have shown antibiotic abilities for resistant bacteria, yeast and fungi. Cycloaspeptides could be a potential treatment for asthma, as it is slightly toxic to lung fibroblasts, the human lung cells responsible for inflammation. Other compounds could be used in treatments for heavy metal poisoning or cholesterol-lowering.

=== Salinispora pacifica secondary metabolites ===
Although the list of Salinispora pacifica natural compounds identified is not as extensive as found in S. arenicola, the potential pharmaceutical use of these metabolites is of great interest. Some metabolites are effective at inhibiting cancer growth. Cyanosporasides, for example, were found to be a potential inhibitor of human colon carcinoma. Other metabolites can be used as antioxidants or antibiotics. This species also includes some metabolites that can act as immunosuppressants. Mycalamide A was found to be a potential antiviral, antitumor and even a possible HIV treatment, as it inhibits the activation of the preferred T cell host of HIV. Pacificanones A and B are other metabolites with immunosuppressant capacities and possible applications in the treatment of allergies.

==== Lomaiviticins A and B ====
Salinispora pacifica produces a cytotoxic family of secondary metabolites called lomaiviticins. They were the first compounds isolated from the genus Salinispora, with the structures being published in 2001. It was initially reported that the producing bacterial strain was a new Micromonospora species with "Micromonospora lomaivitiensis" as the proposed name. Further gene sequence analysis revealed that the strain was in fact S. pacifica.

Lomaiviticins are aromatic polyketides in the angucycline family and share a diazo group similar to kinamycins. There are two classes of this natural product: lomaiviticin A and lomaiviticin B. Both classes demonstrate potent activity that is damaging to DNA, and is observed to be highly cytotoxic against human cancer cells. Lomaiviticin A in particular generates the greatest activity and is the most abundant of the two.

Due to their unique molecular architecture and biological activities, lomaiviticins are an ideal natural product for chemical synthesis. However, notwithstanding the interest shown by the synthetic chemistry community, total synthesis of lomaiviticins has not yet been achieved and the enzymatic chemistry associated with lomaiviticin assembly has not yet been extensively researched. From studying their distinctive structure, it is theorized that the synthesis of this product will lead to many novel enzymatic transformations. In addition to driving the discovery of new analogs through metabolic engineering or chemoenzymatic synthesis, further research could uncover applicable tools for biocatalysis and metabolic engineering.

=== Salinispora tropica secondary metabolites ===
The number of secondary metabolites identified and isolated from Salinispora tropica is fewer than the two other species. However, the pharmaceutical and clinical relevance of these metabolites is much higher. As of yet Salinosporamide is the most successful secondary metabolite of Salinisopora from the clinical point of view. It has already been moved into human trials, and it has shown to be a strong anti-cancer agent. Salinispora tropica also produces antiprotealide, another anti-cancer agent which is potentially the strongest cancer inhibitor within the Salinospora secondary metabolite lists. This natural compound is a very potent cytotoxin for myeloma cells.
