= Nikolai Krasilnikov (microbiologist) =

Soviet scientist

- Николай Красильников
- Born: 18 December 1896; Village Podvyazki, Mosalsky Uyezd, Kaluga Governorate, Russian Empire
- Died: 11 July 1973 (aged 76); Moscow, Soviet Union
- Citizenship: Soviet
- Scientific career
- Fields: Soil microbiology

Nikolai Aleksandrovich Krasilnikov (Russian: Николай Александрович Красильников; 18 December 1896 – 11 July 1973) was a Soviet microbiologist, bacteriologist and soil scientist.

== Tribute ==
- Krasilnikovia cinnamomea is a bacterial genus named after him of the family Micromonosporaceae

== See also ==
- List of soil scientists

== Bibliography ==
- Soil Microorganisms and Higher Plants, 1958
