= Cañizal =

Coordinates: 41°10′N 5°22′W

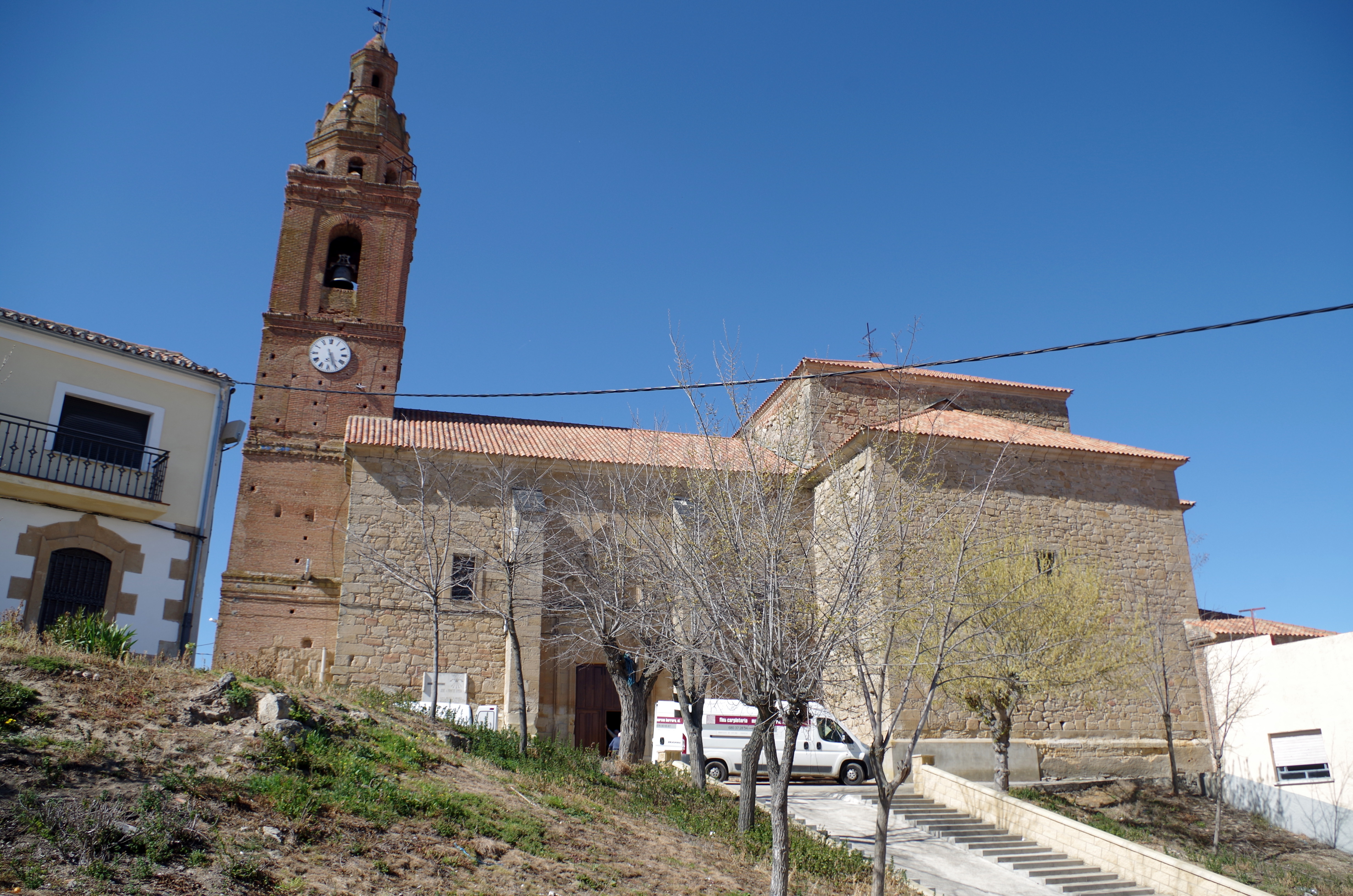

- Coat of arms
- Interactive map of Cañizal
- Country: Spain
- Autonomous community: Castile and León
- Province: Zamora
- Municipality: Cañizal

Area
  - Total: 35 km^{2} (14 sq mi)

Population (2025-01-01)
  - Total: 410
  - Density: 12/km^{2} (30/sq mi)
- Time zone: UTC+1 (CET)
  - Summer (DST): UTC+2 (CEST)

Cañizal is a municipality located in the province of Zamora, Castile and León, Spain. According to the 2009 census (INE), the municipality has a population of 541 inhabitants.

== See also ==
- www.Canizal-Zamora.es :: Photograph album of Cañizal.
