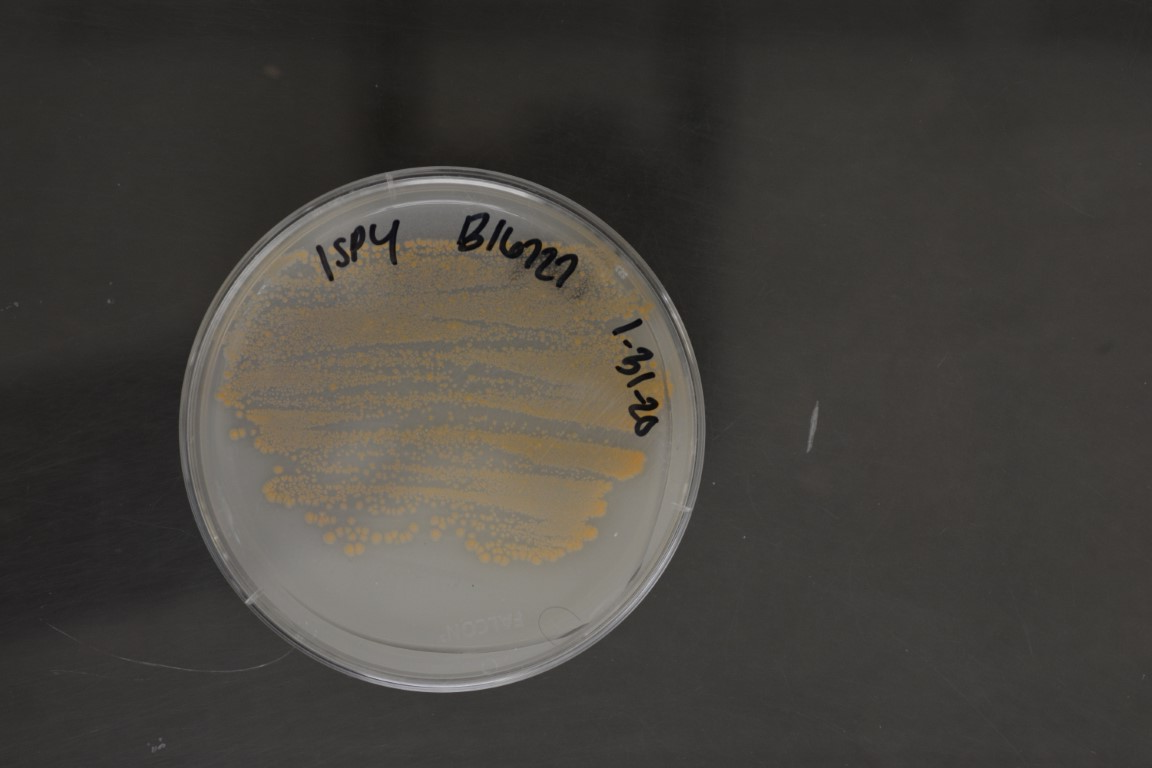
- Actinoplanes utahensis on agar plate

Scientific classification
- Domain: Bacteria
- Kingdom: Bacillati
- Phylum: Actinomycetota
- Class: Actinomycetes
- Order: Micromonosporales; Genilloud 2015
- Family: Micromonosporaceae; Krasil'nikov 1938 (Approved Lists 1980)

Type genus
- Micromonospora Ørskov 1923 (Approved Lists 1980)

Genera
- See text

Synonyms
- Synonyms of Micromonosporales: Actinocatenisporales Salam et al. 2020; Phytomonosporales Salam et al. 2020; Actinoplanetales corrig. Cavalier-Smith 2002; Micromonosporineae Stackebrandt et al. 1997; Synonyms of Micromonosporaceae: Actinoplanetaceae corrig. Couch 1955; Phytomonosporaceae Salam et al. 2020; Actinocatenisporaceae Salam et al. 2020

= Micromonosporaceae =

Family of bacteria

Micromonosporaceae is a family of bacteria of the class Actinomycetia. They are gram-positive, spore-forming soil organisms that form a true mycelium.

== Phylogeny ==
The currently accepted taxonomy is based on the List of Prokaryotic names with Standing in Nomenclature (LPSN) and National Center for Biotechnology Information (NCBI).

Whole-genome based phylogeny (Note: Actinorhabdospora, Allocatelliglobosispora, Allorhizocola, Catellatospora, Couchioplanes, Krasilnikovia, Luedemannella, Mangrovihabitans, Phytohabitans, Phytomonospora, Pilimelia, Planosporangium, Plantactinospora, Polymorphospora, Rhizocola, Rugosimonospora, Spirilliplanes, and Virgisporangium are not included in this phylogenetic tree.)

- - Glycomycetales
    - Glycomycetaceae
  - Micromonosporales
    - Actinocatenisporaceae
      Actinocatenispora
    - Micromonosporaceae
      - Longispora
      - - - Catelliglobosispora
          - Hamadaea
        - - Dactylosporangium
          - - - Catenuloplanes
              - - Pseudosporangium
                - Actinoplanes
            - - Asanoa
              - - Salinispora Maldonado et al. 2005
                - Micromonospora

16S rRNA based LTP_10_2024

- Micromonosporales
  - - Actinocatenisporaceae
      Actinocatenispora Thawai et al. 2006
  - - - Phytomonosporaceae
        - Actinorhabdospora Mingma et al. 2016
        - Phytomonospora Li et al. 2011
      - Glycomycetaceae
        - Stackebrandtia Labeda & Kroppenstedt 2005
        - - Natronoglycomyces Sorokin et al. 2021
          - - - Salininema corrig. Nikou et al. 2015
              - - Haloglycomyces Guan et al. 2009
                - Salilacibacter Li et al. 2016b
            - Glycomyces Labeda et al. 1985
    - - Micromonosporaceae
        - - Longispora Matsumoto et al. 2003
          - - Hamadaea Ara et al. 2008
            - - Allocatelliglobosispora Lee and Lee 2011
              - - - Catelliglobosispora Ara et al. 2008
                  - - Allorhizocola Sun et al. 2019
                    - Rhizocola Matsumoto et al. 2014
                - Catellatospora Asano and Kawamoto 1986
        - - Luedemannella Ara and Kudo 2007
          - - - Planosporangium Wiese et al. 2008
              - - Virgisporangium corrig. Tamura et al. 2001
                - Dactylosporangium Thiemann et al. 1967
            - - Rugosimonospora Monciardini et al. 2009
              - - Pilimelia Kane 1966
                - - Asanoa Lee and Hah 2002
                  - - - Spirilliplanes Tamura, Hayakawa & Hatano 1997
                      - - - - Mangrovihabitans Liu et al. 2017
                            - Actinoplanes~1
                          - Verrucosispora
                        - - Catenuloplanes Yokota et al. 1993
                          - - Actinoplanes Couch 1950
                            - - - - Krasilnikovia Ara and Kudo 2007
                                  - - Couchioplanes caeruleus azureus
                                    - - Couchioplanes Tamura et al. 1994
                                      - - Nucisporomicrobium Han et al. 2022
                                        - Pseudosporangium Ara et al. 2008
                                - - Symbioplanes Roman, Fedorenko & Gromyko 2024
                                  - - - Jidongwangia Jia et al. 2013 ex Han et al. 2023
                                      - Actinoplanes nipponensis
                                    - Actinoplanes~2
                              - Paractinoplanes Roman, Fedorenko & Gromyko 2024
                    - - Phytohabitans Inahashi et al. 2010
                      - - - Micromonospora~2
                          - - Micromonospora tarapacensis
                            - Salinispora
                        - - - Micromonospora~3
                            - Plantactinospora
                          - Micromonospora Ørskov 1923 (incl. Polymorphospora Tamura et al. 2006)

120 marker proteins based GTDB 10-RS226

- Micromonosporaceae s.l.
  - - (Phytomonosporaceae)
      - Actinorhabdospora
      - Phytomonospora
    - (Glycomycetaceae)
      - Stackebrandtia
      - - Natronoglycomyces
        - - Haloglycomyces
          - Glycomyces
  - - (Actinocatenisporaceae)
      Actinocatenispora
    - (Micromonosporaceae) s.s.
      - Longispora
      - - Natronosporangium Sorokin et al. 2025
        - - - Rugosimonospora
            - - Luedemannella
              - - Planosporangium
                - - Virgisporangium
                  - Dactylosporangium
          - - - - Allocatelliglobosispora
                - Hamadaea
              - - - Allorhizocola
                  - - Catelliglobosispora
                    - Rhizocola
                - Catellatospora
            - - Pilimelia
              - - - Catenuloplanes
                  - - Spirilliplanes Tamura et al. 1997
                    - Actinoplanes (incl. Jidongwangia; Krasilnikovia; Mangrovihabitans; Paractinoplanes; Pseudosporangium; Symbioplanes)
                - - - Phytohabitans
                    - Asanoa
                  - - Polymorphospora
                    - - Micromonospora pattaloongensis
                      - - Micromonospora polyrhachis
                        - - - Micromonospora pisi
                            - Plantactinospora Qin et al. 2009
                          - Micromonospora [incl. Salinispora; Verrucosispora]

Genera incertae sedis:

- Melissospora Tellatin et al. 2025
- Rhizomonospora Yoon & Tamura 2025
- "Solwaraspora" Magarvey et al. 2004

== See also ==
- Bacterial taxonomy
- List of bacterial orders
- List of bacteria genera
