= Capillaceus =

Capillaceus may refer to:

- Actinoplanes capillaceus, bacterium
- Cantharidus capillaceus, species of sea snail
- Juncus capillaceus, rush species
