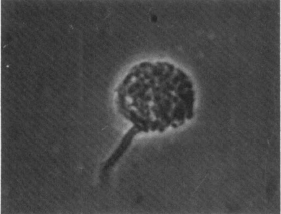
- Picture of A. italicus producing sporangia

Scientific classification
- Domain: Bacteria
- Kingdom: Bacillati
- Phylum: Actinomycetota
- Class: Actinomycetes
- Order: Micromonosporales
- Family: Micromonosporaceae
- Genus: Actinoplanes
- Species: A. italicus

Binomial name
- Actinoplanes italicus Beretta 1973 (Approved Lists 1980)

Type strain
- ATCC 27366; DSM 43146; IFO 13911; JCM 3165; NBRC 13911; NRRL B-16722

= Actinoplanes italicus =

Species of bacterium

Actinoplanes italicus is distinguished by the cherry-red color of its vegetative mycelium, and by the production of soluble pigments. It is also known to produce sporangia when cultured on starch or skim milk agar. Very few strains have been found and cultured, thus A. italicus is relatively uncharacterized.

== Characteristics ==
- Optimum growth temperature is 26 °C
- Optimum growth medium is oatmeal agar
- Respires aerobically
- Gram-positive and motile
- Pathogenicity and other health effects are unknown

== Discovery ==
A. italicus was discovered and isolated from a soil sample obtained from an orchard at Pontelongo, Italy.

=== Laboratory studies ===
During experiments led by Grazia Beretta searching for antibiotic producers from some of the uncommon genera of the Actinomycetales, A. italicus did not produce any antibiotic activity against either Gram-positive or Gram-negative bacteria, and differed in its morphological, cultural, and physiological characteristics. Studies were undertaken to determine whether the first strain, A 52212, of A. italicus represented a new species of Actinoplanes.

==== Materials and methods ====
A. italicus was cultivated using various standard media to determine optimum growth conditions. The media were incubated in the dark at 28 °C. Pigment production was determined by exposing the media to daylight and artificial light at night. Stock slant cultures were kept on oatmeal agar. Every 8 to 16 days, the colony characteristics were observed on starch agar Petri dishes.

Using A Dictionary of Color by Maerz and Paul, color was determined and assigned to the varying pigments produced. Carbon sources were investigated. The media containing carbon sources were inoculated with mycelium, washed twice, and suspended in distilled water. Optimal temperatures were determined by incubating slants of oatmeal agar at 15, 20, 28, 40, and 50 °C.

==== Macroscopic examination ====
The notable cherry-red vegetative mycelium is produced on most of the media used in the experiment. Other members of Actinoplanes, when grown on the same media, produced a yellow and orange vegetative mycelium.

==== Microscopic examination ====
The vegetative mycelium is composed of thin and twisted hyphae. The sporangia produced on starch and skim milk agar have wrinkled surfaces and vary in shapes from spherical to oval and piriform.

The shape of the sporangia takes on a more regular shape immediately before rupturing. The spores released are highly motile, taking on varying shapes of spherical and oval.

== Physiology ==
In peptone-yeast extract-iron agar, A. italicus produces H2S. Within a skim milk agar medium, it was able to hydrolyze casein. Other notable physiological characteristics include its ability to liquefy gelatin, produce tyrosinase, and peptonization without coagulation. The optimal temperature ranges between 28 and 37 °C.

=== Carbon source ===
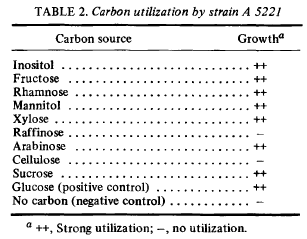
Carbon sources used by A. italicus

A. italicus uses inositol, fructose, rhamnose, mannitol, xylose, arabinose, sucrose, and glucose as carbon sources for growth. It differs from many members of its genus such as A. utahensis and A. missouriensis, which do not use inositol; from A philippinensis and A. armeniacus, which use raffinose; and from A. brasiliensis and A philippinensis, which usw cellulose. A. italicus is also noted to use natural rubber as a sole carbon source.

=== Soluble pigments ===
When cultured in different growth media, A. italicus tends to produce varying soluble pigments based on its carbon source. On some media, such as nutrient agar, calcium-malate agar, and Bennet's agar, A. italicus does not produce any pigment at all. On oatmeal, starch, and skim milk agar, the characteristic cherry-red pigment is produced. An amber color is produced when the organism is cultured on Hickey and Tresner agar, potato agar, and nitrate broth, whereas glucose asparagine agar and tyrosine agar would result in a pink color. A deep orange yellowish pigment is produced by growth on Czapek glucose agar.

== Phylogeny ==
A. italicus belongs to the phylum Actinomycetota. It is most closely related to Actinoplanes couchii with 98.9% similarity using DNA-DNA hybridization.

=== Actinoplanes ===
Actinoplanes belongs to the family Actinoplanaceae. Some characteristics of this genus include able to form motile spores, as well as aerial mycelia and spherica. They are useful in that they can produce ramoplanin, teichoplanin, and valienamine, all of which are critical for the pharmaceutical companies. They generally produce a yellow or orange vegetative mycelium and ordinarily do not produce soluble pigments.

== See also ==
- Sporangia
