= Streptomyces spectabilis =

Scientific classification
- Domain: Bacteria
- Kingdom: Bacillati
- Phylum: Actinomycetota
- Class: Actinomycetes
- Order: Streptomycetales
- Family: Streptomycetaceae
- Genus: Streptomyces
- Species: S. spectabilis

Binomial name
- Streptomyces spectabilis Mason et al. 1961

Type strain
- ATCC 27465, BCRC 12648, CBS 725.72, CBS 725.75, CCRC 12648, CECT 3146, CECT 3156, DSM 40512, DSMZ 40512, IFO 13424, IFO 15441, ISP 5512, JCM 4308, JCM 4832, KCC S-0308, KCC S-0832, KCCS-0308, KCCS-0832, KCTC 9218, LMG 5986, MR ISP-5512, NBIMCC 70, NBRC 13424, NBRC 15441, NCAIM B.01936, NCIB 9733, NCIMB 9733, NRRL 2494, NRRL B-2494, NRRL-ISP 5512, RIA 1385

Species of bacterium

Streptomyces spectabilis is a bacterium species from the genus of Streptomyces. Streptomyces spectabilis produces hangtaimycin, gentamicin, kanamycin, neomycin B, sisomycin, tobramycin, paromomycin, spectinabilin, spectinomycin, aminocyclitol, actinospectacin, prodigiosine and the streptovaricin complex.

== See also ==
- List of Streptomyces species
