= C9H11NO5 =

The molecular formula C_{9}H_{11}NO_{5} may refer to:

- Cetoniacytone A
- Droxidopa
- 6-Hydroxydopa
