= Valienamine =

- Chemical structure of valienamine

Names
- Preferred IUPAC name (1S,2S,4R,6S)-6-Amino-4-(hydroxymethyl)cyclohex-4-ene-1,2,3-triol

Identifiers
CAS Number	38231-86-6
3D model (JSmol)	Interactive image
ChEMBL	ChEMBL1230806
ChemSpider	168149
PubChem CID	193758
CompTox Dashboard (EPA)	DTXSID80191622
- InChI: InChI=1S/C7H13NO4/c8-4-1-3(2-9)5(10)7(12)6(4)11/h1,4-7,9-12H,2,8H2/t4-,5+,6-,7-/m0/s1 Key: XPHOBMULWMGEBA-VZFHVOOUSA-N; InChI=1/C7H13NO4/c8-4-1-3(2-9)5(10)7(12)6(4)11/h1,4-7,9-12H,2,8H2/t4-,5+,6-,7-/m0/s1 Key: XPHOBMULWMGEBA-VZFHVOOUBJ
- SMILES: O[C@@H]1\C(=C/[C@H](N)[C@H](O)[C@H]1O)CO

Properties
Chemical formula	C_{7}H_{13}NO_{4}
Molar mass	175.184 g·mol^{−1}
- Except where otherwise noted, data are given for materials in their standard state (at 25 °C [77 °F], 100 kPa). verify (what is ?) Infobox references

Valienamine is an unsaturated amino sugar with the formula HOCH_{2}(CHOH)_{3}CHNH_{2})CH. It is classified also as a C-7 aminocyclitol. It is a potent inhibitor of glycosidase. It was first isolated by microbial degradation of validoxylamine.

It found as a substructure of pseudooligosaccharides such as the antidiabetic drug acarbose and the antibiotic validamycin. It can be found in Actinoplanes species.

It is an intermediate formed by microbial degradation of validamycins.

Related compounds: valiolamine, validamine, and epi-valiolamine.
