= UDP-galacturonate decarboxylase =

Class of enzymes

Identifiers
- EC no.: 4.1.1.67
- CAS no.: 9054-79-9

Databases
- BRENDA: enzyme data
- ExPASy: NiceZyme view
- KEGG: enzyme entry
- MetaCyc: metabolic pathway
- Rhea: reactions
- PDB structures: RCSB PDB PDBe PDBsum
- Gene Ontology: AmiGO / QuickGO
Search
- PMC: articles
- PubMed: articles
- NCBI: proteins

UDP-galacturonate decarboxylase (EC 4.1.1.67) is an enzyme characterised from Ampullariella digitata that catalyzes the decarboxylation of uridine diphosphate-α-D-galacturonic acid (UDP-α-D-galacturonic acid) to UDP-L-arabinose:

UDP-α-D-galacturonic acid
CO_{2}
UDP-L-arabinose

The reaction is part of the biosynthetic pathway to extracellular polysaccharides in Cordyceps.

This enzyme is a lyase, specifically a carboxy-lyase, which cleave carbon-carbon bonds. The systematic name of this enzyme class is UDP-D-galacturonate carboxy-lyase (UDP-L-arabinose-forming). Other names in use include UDP-galacturonic acid decarboxylase, UDPGalUA carboxy lyase, and UDP-D-galacturonate carboxy-lyase.
