= Aminocyclitol =

Class of chemical compounds

The aminocyclitols are compounds related to cyclitols. They possess features of relative and absolute configuration that are characteristic of their class and have been extensively studied; but these features are not clearly displayed by general methods of stereochemical nomenclature, so that special methods of specifying their configuration are justified and have long been used. In other than stereochemical respects, their nomenclature should follow the general rules of organic chemistry.

== Aminocyclitol natural products ==
The aminocyclitol family of natural products is a class of sugar-derived microbial secondary metabolites that demonstrate significant biological activities. Aminocyclitols are found as a component of aminoglycoside antibiotics which is also called as pseudosugars or pseudosaccharides. Aminocyclitols have chemical structures of a carbon ring with amine functional group(s). The class of aminocyclitol containing natural products can be divided by ring sizes or types of precursors.

=== Five-membered ring aminocyclitols ===
pactamycin

=== Six-membered ring aminocyclitols ===
- 2-deoxy-scyllo-inosose derived aminoglycosides

This class includes kanamycin, neomycin, gentamicin, apramycin, hygromycin.

- myo-inositol 1-phosphate derived aminoglycosides

This class includes streptomycin, spectinomycin.

- sedoheptulose 7-phosphate derived C7N aminocyclitol natural products

This class includes acarbose, validamycin, validoxylamine A, salbostatin, cetoniacytone A, pyralomicin 1a, kirkamide

== Biosynthesis of C7N aminocyclitols ==
Sedoheptulose 7-phosphate, a pentose phosphate pathway intermediate, is a common precursor of C7N aminocyclitol moiety of natural products, such as acarbose, validamycin A, salbostatin, cetoniacytone A, and pyralomicin 1a. 2-epi-5-epi-valiolone synthase (EEVS), one of the sugar phosphate cyclase family enzyme and which is a homolog of 3-dehydroquinate synthase in shikimate pathway, catalyzes the formation of a common intermediate, 2-epi-5-epi-valiolone from sedoheptulose 7-phosphate. After multiple enzyme reaction steps, which include phosphorylation, epimerization, dehydration, and keto-reduction reactions, valienol, an important core structure is formed which leads to the formation of C7N aminocyclitol containing natural products. In validamycin biosynthesis, the C-N linkage which connect the C7 cyclitol moiety to the other was found to be formed by unprecedented actions of nucleotidyltransferase and glycosyltransferase-like enzymes (which is termed pseudoglycosyltransferase).
