= Streptomyces subrutilus =

Scientific classification
- Domain: Bacteria
- Kingdom: Bacillati
- Phylum: Actinomycetota
- Class: Actinomycetes
- Order: Streptomycetales
- Family: Streptomycetaceae
- Genus: Streptomyces
- Species: S. subrutilus

Binomial name
- Streptomyces subrutilus Arai et al. 1964

Type strain
- AS 4.1784, ATCC 27467, BCRC 11921, CBS 689.72, CCRC 11921, CGMCC 4.1784, DSM 40445, IFM 1222, IFM 713, IFO 13388, ISP 5445, JCM 4695, JCM 4834, KCC S-0695, KCTC 9045, LMG 20294, MTCC 4731, NBRC 13388, NRRL B-12377, NRRL-ISP 5445, RIA 1349, VKM Ac-1210

Species of bacterium

Streptomyces subrutilus is a bacterium species from the genus of Streptomyces. Streptomyces subrutilus produces deoxynojirimycin, deoxymannonojirimycin and hydroxystreptomycin.

== See also ==
- List of Streptomyces species
