= Streptomyces nojiriensis =

Scientific classification
- Domain: Bacteria
- Kingdom: Bacillati
- Phylum: Actinomycetota
- Class: Actinomycetia
- Order: Streptomycetales
- Family: Streptomycetaceae
- Genus: Streptomyces
- Species: S. nojiriensis

Binomial name
- Streptomyces nojiriensis Ishida et al. 1967

Type strain
- AS 4.1897, ATCC 29781, CGMCC 4.1897, DSM 41655, IFO 13794, JCM 3382, KCCM 12307, KCTC 9784, LMG 20094, NBRC 13794, NRRL B-16930, SF-426

Species of bacterium

Streptomyces nojiriensis is a bacterial species from the genus Streptomyces which was originally isolated from soil at Lake Nojiri in Japan. Streptomyces nojiriensis produces nojirimycin.

== See also ==
- List of Streptomyces species
