= Actinoplanes lichenis =

Scientific classification
- Domain: Bacteria
- Kingdom: Bacillati
- Phylum: Actinomycetota
- Class: Actinomycetia
- Order: Micromonosporales
- Family: Micromonosporaceae
- Genus: Actinoplanes
- Species: A. lichenis

Binomial name
- Actinoplanes lichenis Phongsopitanun et al. 2016

Type strain
- LDG1-22; JCM 30485; PCU 344; TISTR 2343

Species of bacterium

Actinoplanes lichenis is a bacterium from the genus Actinoplanes which has been isolated from lichen in Thailand.
