= Actinoplanes bogorensis =

Scientific classification
- Domain: Bacteria
- Kingdom: Bacillati
- Phylum: Actinomycetota
- Class: Actinomycetia
- Order: Micromonosporales
- Family: Micromonosporaceae
- Genus: Actinoplanes
- Species: A. bogorensis

Binomial name
- Actinoplanes bogorensis orrig. Nurkanto et al. 2016

Type strain
- InaCC A522; NBRC 110975; LIPI11-2-Ac043

Synonyms
- Actinoplanes bogoriensis Nurkanto et al. 2016

Species of bacterium

Actinoplanes bogorensis is a bacterium from the genus Actinoplanes which has been isolated from isolated from leaf litter in Indonesia.
