= Actinoplanes nipponensis =

Scientific classification
- Domain: Bacteria
- Kingdom: Bacillati
- Phylum: Actinomycetota
- Class: Actinomycetia
- Order: Micromonosporales
- Family: Micromonosporaceae
- Genus: Actinoplanes
- Species: A. nipponensis

Binomial name
- Actinoplanes nipponensis Wink et al. 2014

Type strain
- ATCC 31145; DSM 43867; IFO 14063; KCTC 9594; NBRC 14063; FH 2241

Species of bacterium

Actinoplanes nipponensis is a Gram-positive and antibiotic-producing bacterium from the genus Actinoplanes which has been isolated from soil from Japan.
