= Actinoplanes luteus =

Scientific classification
- Domain: Bacteria
- Kingdom: Bacillati
- Phylum: Actinomycetota
- Class: Actinomycetia
- Order: Micromonosporales
- Family: Micromonosporaceae
- Genus: Actinoplanes
- Species: A. luteus

Binomial name
- Actinoplanes luteus Suriyachadkun et al. 2015

Type strain
- BCC 41582; NBRC 109644; A-T 5190

Species of bacterium

Actinoplanes luteus is a bacterium from the genus Actinoplanes which has been isolated from forest soil from Lamphun, Thailand.
