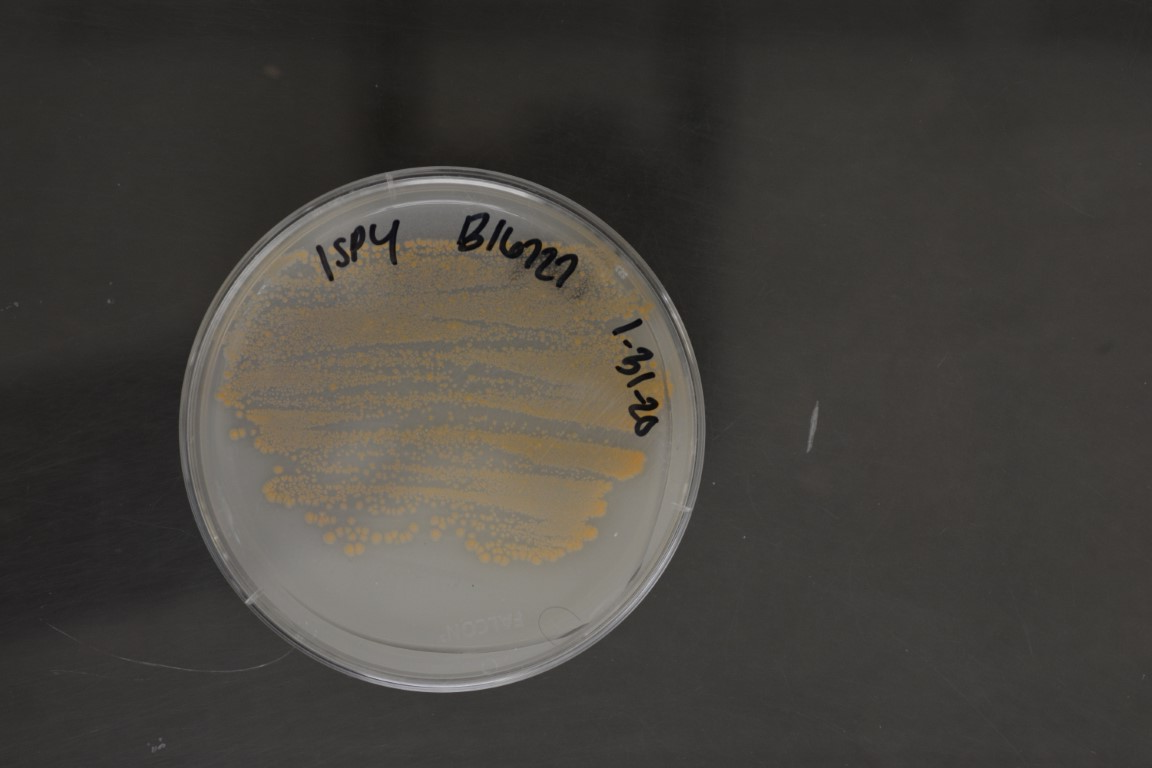

Scientific classification
- Domain: Bacteria
- Kingdom: Bacillati
- Phylum: Actinomycetota
- Class: Actinomycetia
- Order: Micromonosporales
- Family: Micromonosporaceae
- Genus: Actinoplanes
- Species: A. utahensis

Binomial name
- Actinoplanes utahensis Couch 1963 (Approved Lists 1980)

Type strain
- ATCC 14539; DSM 43147; IFO 13244; JCM 3122; NBRC 13244; NRRL B-16727; VKM Ac-674

= Actinoplanes utahensis =

Species of bacterium

Actinoplanes utahensis is a species of bacteria and a source of the drug acarbose, an alpha-glucosidase inhibitor used in the treatment of diabetes mellitus.

== Description ==
A. utahensis are irregular in size and shape. They form sporangia which are 5 to 18 micrometers in diameter, and contain spores arranged in irregular coils. A. utahensis are motile by way of a number of flagella at one end.

== History ==
A. utahensis was originally identified by John Couch from soils collected from Salt Lake City's Liberty Park as well as along U.S. Route 40 in Nevada.
