= Actinoplanes lutulentus =

Scientific classification
- Domain: Bacteria
- Kingdom: Bacillati
- Phylum: Actinomycetota
- Class: Actinomycetia
- Order: Micromonosporales
- Family: Micromonosporaceae
- Genus: Actinoplanes
- Species: A. lutulentus

Binomial name
- Actinoplanes lutulentus Gao et al. 2014

Type strain
- NEAU-GRX6; CGMCC 4.7090; DSM 45883

Species of bacterium

Actinoplanes lutulentus is a bacterium in the genus Actinoplanes which has been isolated from mucky soil collected from Jinlong Mountain, in Harbin, Heilongjiang Province, China.
