= Actinoplanes xinjiangensis =

Scientific classification
- Domain: Bacteria
- Kingdom: Bacillati
- Phylum: Actinomycetota
- Class: Actinomycetia
- Order: Micromonosporales
- Family: Micromonosporaceae
- Genus: Actinoplanes
- Species: A. atraurantiacus

Binomial name
- Actinoplanes atraurantiacus Sun et al. 2009

Type strain
- 03-8772; CCM 7527; JCM 16606; KCTC 19461

Species of bacterium

Actinoplanes xinjiangensis is a Gram-positive and antibiotic-resistant bacterium from the genus Actinoplanes which has been isolated from the Xinjiang Uyghur Autonomous Region, China.
