= Actinoplanes atraurantiacus =

Scientific classification
- Domain: Bacteria
- Kingdom: Bacillati
- Phylum: Actinomycetota
- Class: Actinomycetes
- Order: Micromonosporales
- Family: Micromonosporaceae
- Genus: Actinoplanes
- Species: A. atraurantiacus

Binomial name
- Actinoplanes atraurantiacus Zhang et al. 2012

Type strain
- CGMCC 4.6857; JCM 17700; Y16

Species of bacterium

Actinoplanes atraurantiacus is a Gram-positive bacterium from the genus Actinoplanes which has been isolated from forest soil in Yunnan, China.
