= Spectinabilin =

Identifiers
CAS Number	59795-94-7
3D model (JSmol)	Interactive image
ChEBI	CHEBI:142841
ChemSpider	8272109
PubChem CID	10096575
UNII	NH93BW6NAQ
- InChI: InChI=1S/C28H31NO6/c1-17(11-18(2)13-22-7-9-24(10-8-22)29(31)32)12-19(3)14-23-15-25(34-16-23)27-20(4)26(30)21(5)28(33-6)35-27/h7-14,25H,15-16H2,1-6H3/b17-11+,18-13+,19-12+,23-14-/t25-/m1/s1 Key: IZICQJAGBLBAMJ-QDYRYYKCSA-N
- SMILES: CC1=C(OC(=C(C1=O)C)OC)[C@H]2C/C(=C/C(=C/C(=C/C(=C/C3=CC=C(C=C3)[N+](=O)[O-])/C)/C)/C)/CO2

Properties
Chemical formula	C_{28}H_{31}NO_{6}
Molar mass	477.557 g·mol^{−1}

Related compounds
Related compounds	Arabilin
- Except where otherwise noted, data are given for materials in their standard state (at 25 °C [77 °F], 100 kPa). Infobox references

Spectinabilin is a nitrophenyl-substituted polyketide metabolite. It was first isolated from crude streptovaricin complex produced by Streptomyces spectabilis and presented at the 13th Interscience Conference on Antimicrobial Agents and Chemotherapy in Washington, D.C. in September 1973. Spectinabilin is a biologically active compound, exhibiting both antimalarial and antiviral activity.

== Biosynthesis ==
Production of spectinabilin occurs through a type one polyketide synthase, and is regulated differently in S. spectabilis and Streptomyces orinoci despite being nearly identical gene clusters. The biosynthesis of Spectinabillin initially requires 4 open reading frames (ORF) for the production of the starter unit, p-nitrobenzoic acid (pNBA) from chorismate. pNBA is then loaded onto the polyketide synthase, and undergoes 6 rounds of elongation and reduction. Briefly, pNBA is loaded onto the PKA and elongated by methyl malonyl-coa (mmCoA), which is then reduced twice to afford the enone. This elongation and subsequent reduction is then repeated three additional times with another unit of mmCoA. The final mmCoA loaded in the sequence is completely reduced to saturation. Malonyl CoA (mCoA) is then loaded, followed by two additional units of mmCoA. Then, the previously loaded mCoA cyclizes with the most recently loaded mmCoA as a result of the terminal thioesterase(TE) domain to form a 6 membered terminal ring of the spectinabillin intermediate. The alcohol of the ring is then methylated. A furan is then formed via oxidation and subsequent cyclization catalyzed by a Cyt p-450 monoxygenase to afford spectinabillin.

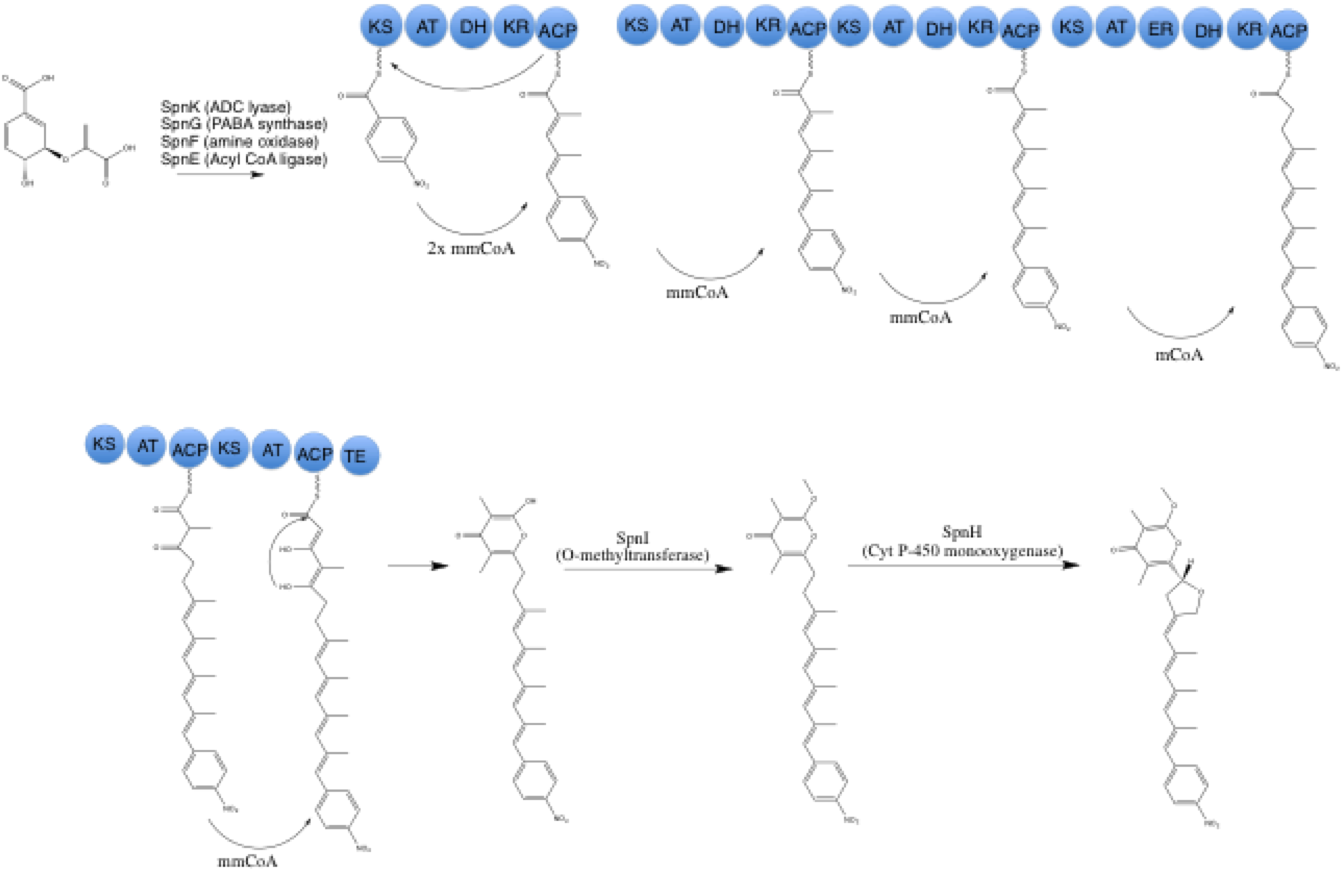
Proposed biosynthetic route to Spectinabilin. mmCoA: methylmalonyl-Coa, mCoA: Malonyl-CoA. Spn proteins assigned possible function according to their homology to proteins of known function.
