= Streptomyces orinoci =

Scientific classification
- Domain: Bacteria
- Kingdom: Bacillati
- Phylum: Actinomycetota
- Class: Actinomycetes
- Order: Streptomycetales
- Family: Streptomycetaceae
- Genus: Streptomyces
- Species: S. orinoci

Binomial name
- Streptomyces orinoci Witt and Stackebrandt 1991

Type strain
- ATCC 23202, BCRC 15173, CBS 767.72, CCRC 15173, CECT 3267, CEST 3267, CGMCC 4.1989, CIP 108141, DSM 40571, DSMZ 40571, Farmitalia FI 1882, IFM 1226, IFO 13466, IPV 1901, ISP 5571, JCM 4546, JCM 4807, KCC S-0807, KCTC 9870, Milano 1882 FI, NBRC 13466, NRRL B-3379, NRRL-ISP 5571, RIA 1427, VKM Ac-929

Synonyms
- Streptoverticillium orinoci

Species of bacterium

Streptomyces orinoci is a bacterium species from the genus of Streptomyces which has been isolated from soil. Streptomyces orinoci produces the antibiotics spectinabilin, neoantimycin, neoaureothin and ochramycin.

== See also ==
- List of Streptomyces species
