= Spectinomycin =

Antibiotic

Clinical data
- Trade names: Trobicin
- Other names: (2R,4aR,5aR,6S,7S,8R,9S,9aR,10aS)-4a,7,9-trihydroxy-2-methyl-6,8-bis(methylamino)decahydro-4H-pyrano[2,3-b][1,4]benzodioxin-4-one, SPT/SPE/SC/SP
- AHFS/Drugs.com: Monograph
- Routes of administration: IM
- ATC code: J01XX04 (WHO)

Legal status
- Legal status: US: not available

Identifiers
- IUPAC name: (1R,3S,5R,8R,10S,11S,12S,13R,14S)-8,12,14-trihydroxy-5-methyl-11,13-bis(methylamino)-2,4,9-trioxatricyclo[8.4.0.0^{3,8}]tetradecan-7-one
- CAS Number: 1695-77-8
- PubChem CID: 15541
- DrugBank: DB00919
- ChemSpider: 14785
- UNII: 93AKI1U6QF
- KEGG: D08526
- ChEBI: CHEBI:9215
- ChEMBL: ChEMBL1167
- CompTox Dashboard (EPA): DTXSID9023592
- ECHA InfoCard: 100.015.374

Chemical and physical data
- Formula: C_{14}H_{24}N_{2}O_{7}
- Molar mass: 332.353 g·mol^{−1}
- 3D model (JSmol): Interactive image
- Melting point: 184 to 194 °C (363 to 381 °F)
- SMILES: O=C1[C@@]2(O[C@@H]3[C@@H](NC)[C@@H](O)[C@@H](NC)[C@H](O)[C@H]3O[C@@H]2O[C@@H](C1)C)O
- InChI: InChI=1S/C14H24N2O7/c1-5-4-6(17)14(20)13(21-5)22-12-10(19)7(15-2)9(18)8(16-3)11(12)23-14/h5,7-13,15-16,18-20H,4H2,1-3H3/t5-,7-,8+,9+,10+,11-,12-,13+,14+/m1/s1; Key:UNFWWIHTNXNPBV-WXKVUWSESA-N

Spectinomycin, sold under the tradename Trobicin among others, is an antibiotic useful for the treatment of gonorrhea infections. It is given by injection into a muscle.

Common side effects include pain at the area of injection, rash, nausea, fever, and trouble sleeping. Severe allergic reactions may occasionally occur. It is generally safe to use during pregnancy. It may be used by those who are allergic to penicillin or cephalosporins. It is in the aminocyclitol class of drugs and works by stopping the making of protein by certain bacteria.

Spectinomycin was discovered in 1961. It is on the World Health Organization's List of Essential Medicines. It is not available in the United States for human use. It is made from the bacterium Streptomyces spectabilis.

== Medical uses ==
It is given by intramuscular injection to treat gonorrhea, especially in patients who are allergic to penicillins.

This antibiotic is no longer available in the United States for human use, but is still available for veterinary use.

== Side effects ==
Side effects include itching, chills, stomach ache, and red rash.

== Mechanism of action ==
Spectinomycin binds to the 30S subunit of the bacterial ribosome and interrupts protein synthesis. One form of resistance has emerged in the 16S ribosomal RNA in Pasteurella multocida.

== Biosynthetic mechanism ==
Proposed spectinomycin biosynthesis

Biosynthesis of spectinomycin begins similarly to the aminoglycosides, with the formation of an inositol ring. The difference is the initial modification that forms the inositol ring of spectinomycin. The process begins with a glucose-6-phosphate (1a), which is oxidized by NAD^{+} to form a ketone at C2 (2a). This ketone is then formed into a primary amine group through pyridoxal phosphate (PLP) and glutamine transamination (3a). This process is repeated again at C4 to form a second primary amine (4a). Once these two amines are present, the glucose ring is ready to be methylated through two S-adenosyl methionine molecules (5a). With this methylation, the glucose ring is finally ready to be converted into an inositol ring through inositol cyclase (6a). This can then be hydrolyzed to get rid of the phosphate group, making the inositol ring necessary for spectinomycin (7a).

While all this happens, an alternate pathway is occurring creating the sugar functional group from a similar starting product. In this pathway, glucose-1-phosphate is used as the starting product (1b). This is converted into a TDP-glucose through TDP synthase (2b). TDP glucose then has the hydroxyl removed from C6 through a hydratase enzyme (3b), which is then reduced through NADH at C4 creating a new product (4b). With this ketone present, PLP and glutamine can come in to convert it to a primary amine (5b) which can then be removed through a deaminase (6b). This conversion to 6b is also accompanied by a double reduction at C4 and C3 through two more NADH molecules, giving the final product necessary to form the aminoglycoside. With this, products 7a and 6b can come together, removing the TDP functional group and combining with the sugar molecule to form the aminoglycoside spectinomycin.

=== Nature ===
It is in the aminocyclitol class of antibiotics, which are closely related to the aminoglycosides. Spectinomycin is industrially produced by fermentation of the bacterium Streptomyces spectabilis. Spectinomycin is produced in nature by many organisms including cyanobacteria and various plant species. It is present in the genome or plastome of many plastids as the spc operon, which is usually two to 10 genes long. The difference in size may be due to the elimination of obsolete genes or the takeover of its function by nuclear genes. Spectinomycin is mainly produced by organisms as a defence mechanism against predators.

== History ==
Spectinomycin was discovered 1961. A disruption in the supply occurred in 2001.
