= Actinoplanes abujensis =

Scientific classification
- Domain: Bacteria
- Kingdom: Bacillati
- Phylum: Actinomycetota
- Class: Actinomycetes
- Order: Micromonosporales
- Family: Micromonosporaceae
- Genus: Actinoplanes
- Species: A. abujensis

Binomial name
- Actinoplanes abujensis Sazak et al. 2012

Type strain
- A4029; DSM 45518; KCTC 19984; NRRL B-24835

Species of bacterium

Actinoplanes abujensis is a bacterium from the genus Actinoplanes which has been isolated from arid soil in Abuja, Nigeria.
