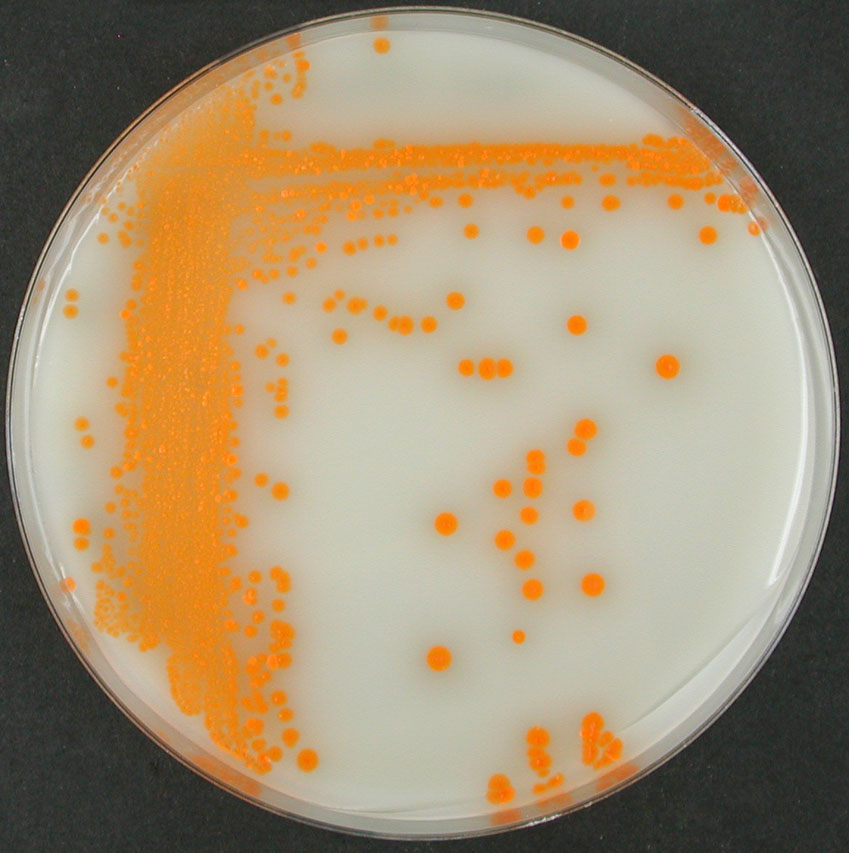

Scientific classification
- Domain: Bacteria
- Kingdom: Bacillati
- Phylum: Actinomycetota
- Class: Actinomycetes
- Order: Micromonosporales
- Family: Micromonosporaceae
- Genus: Actinoplanes
- Species: A. teichomyceticus

Binomial name
- Actinoplanes teichomyceticus Wink et al. 2006

Type strain
- AB8327; FH 2149; DSM 43866; ATCC 31121; BCRC 12106; FERM P-3462; IMSNU 20043; IMET 9254; JCM 3252; KCC A-0252; KCTC 9543; NBRC 13999; NCIMB 12640; NRRL B-16726; SANK 60479

= Actinoplanes teichomyceticus =

Species of bacterium

Actinoplanes teichomyceticus is an aerobic, spore-forming, mesophilic bacterium from the genus of Actinoplanes that was isolated from soil and produces antibiotic compounds. In 1978, the strain ATCC 31121 of A. teichomyceticus was isolated from a soil sample from Nimodi Village, Indore, India, and was found to produce the antibiotic teicoplanin.
