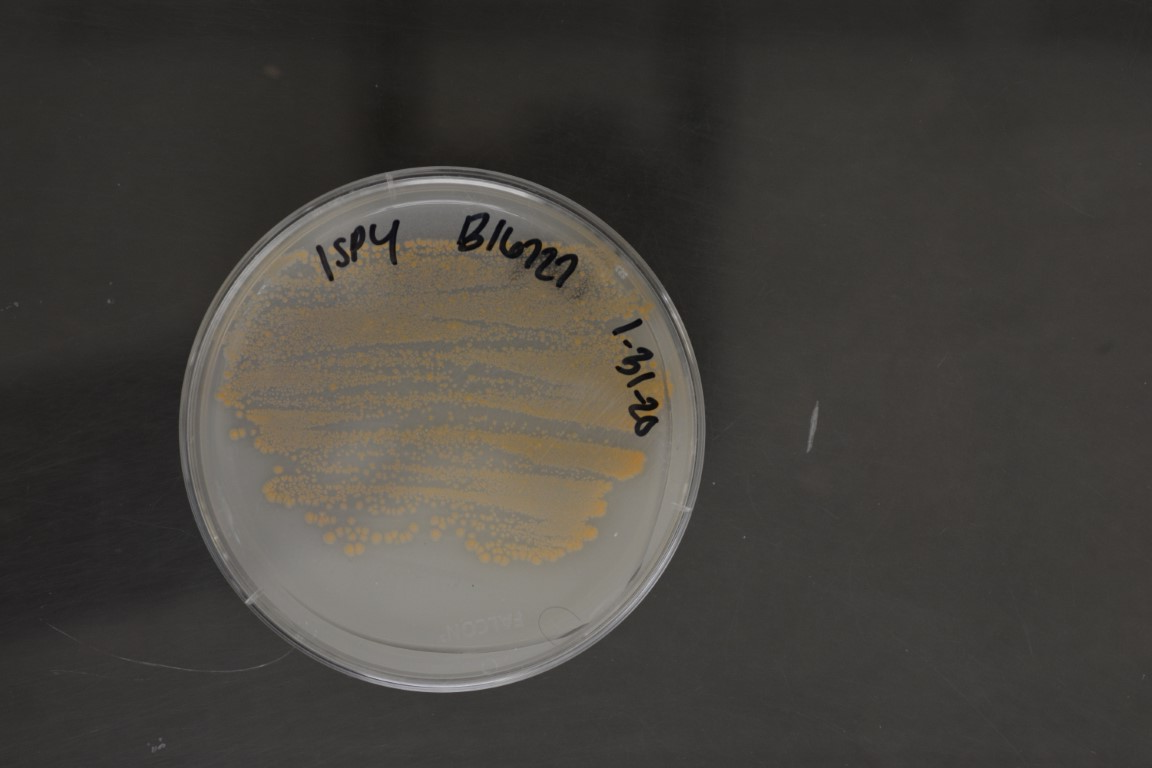
- Actinoplanes utahensis on agar plate

Scientific classification
- Domain: Bacteria
- Kingdom: Bacillati
- Phylum: Actinomycetota
- Class: Actinomycetia
- Order: Micromonosporales
- Family: Micromonosporaceae
- Genus: Actinoplanes; Couch 1950 (Approved Lists 1980)

Type species
- Actinoplanes philippinensis Couch 1950 (Approved Lists 1980)

Species
- See text.

Synonyms
- Ampullariella Couch 1964 (Approved Lists 1980); "Ampullaria" Couch 1963; Amorphosporangium Couch 1963 (Approved Lists 1980)

= Actinoplanes =

Genus of bacteria

Actinoplanes is a genus in the family Micromonosporaceae. They have aerial mycelia and spherical, motile spores. Actinoplanes species produce the pharmaceutically important compounds valienamine (a precursor to the antidiabetic drug acarbose and to the antibiotic validamycin), teicoplanin, and ramoplanin.

== Species ==
Actinoplanes comprises the following species:

- A. abujensis Sazak et al. 2012
- "A. arizonaensis" Karwowski et al. 1988
- A. atraurantiacus Zhang et al. 2012
- A. auranticolor (Couch 1963) Stackebrandt and Kroppenstedt 1988
- "A. aureus" Song et al. 2021
- A. bogorensis corrig. Nurkanto et al. 2016
- A. brasiliensis Thiemann et al. 1969 (Approved Lists 1980)
- A. campanulatus (Couch 1963) Stackebrandt and Kroppenstedt 1988
- A. capillaceus Matsumoto et al. 2001
- A. cibodasensis Nurkanto et al. 2015
- "A. coloradoensis" Jackson et al. 1987
- A. consettensis Goodfellow et al. 1990
- A. couchii Kämpfer et al. 2007
- A. cyaneus Terekhova et al. 1987
- A. deccanensis Parenti et al. 1975 (Approved Lists 1980)
- A. derwentensis Goodfellow et al. 1990
- A. deserti Habib et al. 2019
- A. digitatis (Couch 1963) Stackebrandt and Kroppenstedt 1988
- A. durhamensis Goodfellow et al. 1990
- "A. ferrugineus" (Ara et al. 2008) Nouioui et al. 2018
- A. ferrugineus Palleroni 1979 (Approved Lists 1980)
- A. flavus Luo et al. 2021
- A. friuliensis Aretz et al. 2001
- A. globisporus (Thiemann 1967) Stackebrandt and Kroppenstedt 1988
- "A. hulinensis" Shen et al. 2013
- A. humidus Goodfellow et al. 1990
- A. ianthinogenes (ex Coronelli et al. 1974) Tamura et al. 2011
- A. italicus Beretta 1973 (Approved Lists 1980)
- A. lichenicola Saeng-in et al. 2021
- A. lichenis Phongsopitanun et al. 2016
- A. liguriensis Wink et al. 2006
- A. lobatus (Couch 1963) Stackebrandt and Kroppenstedt 1988
- A. luteus Suriyachadkun et al. 2015
- A. lutulentus Gao et al. 2014
- A. missouriensis Couch 1963 (Approved Lists 1980)
- A. nipponensis Wink et al. 2014
- A. octamycinicus corrig. (ex Gauze et al. 1979) Tamura et al. 2011
- A. ovalisporus Saeng-in et al. 2021
- A. palleronii Goodfellow et al. 1990
- A. philippinensis Couch 1950 (Approved Lists 1980)
- A. ramoplaninifer Marcone et al. 2017
- A. rectilineatus Lechevalier and Lechevalier 1975 (Approved Lists 1980)
- A. regularis (Couch 1963) Stackebrandt and Kroppenstedt 1988
- A. rhizophilus He et al. 2015
- A. rishiriensis Yamamura et al. 2012
- A. sediminis Qu et al. 2018
- A. siamensis Suriyachadkun et al. 2013
- A. sichuanensis Sun et al. 2009
- "A. solisilvae" Ma et al. 2020
- A. subglobosus Ngaemthao et al. 2016
- A. teichomyceticus Wink et al. 2006
- "A. teicomyceticus" Pryka et al. 1988
- A. tereljensis Ara et al. 2010
- A. toevensis Ara et al. 2010
- A. tropicalis Nurkanto et al. 2015
- A. utahensis Couch 1963 (Approved Lists 1980)
- A. xinjiangensis Sun et al. 2009
