= Arabilin =

Identifiers
CAS Number	1323981-37-8
3D model (JSmol)	Interactive image
ChemSpider	78434804
PubChem CID	49817476
- InChI: InChI=1S/C28H31NO6/c1-17(11-18(2)13-22-7-9-24(10-8-22)29(31)32)12-19(3)14-23-15-25(34-16-23)27-20(4)26(30)21(5)28(33-6)35-27/h7-10,12-14,16,25H,11,15H2,1-6H3/b17-12-,18-13+,19-14- Key: VDYKJNNKAHKFAL-GQEYKGHLSA-N
- SMILES: CC1=C(OC(=C(C1=O)C)OC)C2CC(=CO2)/C=C(/C)\C=C(\C)/C/C(=C/C3=CC=C(C=C3)[N+](=O)[O-])/C

Properties
Chemical formula	C_{28}H_{31}NO_{6}
Molar mass	477.557 g·mol^{−1}
- Except where otherwise noted, data are given for materials in their standard state (at 25 °C [77 °F], 100 kPa). Infobox references

Arabilin is a chemical compound with the molecular formula C_{28}H_{31}NO_{6}. It was first isolated from the MK756-CF1 strain of Streptomyces in 2010. Chemically, it contains a substituted γ-pyrone ring and a p-nitrophenyl group that is rarely found in nature.

Arabilin acts as an androgen antagonist, and therefore has attracted research interest in its potential pharmacological use. A laboratory synthesis of arabilin has been reported.

Related compounds also isolated from Streptomyces include spectinabilin and SNF4435C.
