= Actinoplanes couchii =

Scientific classification
- Domain: Bacteria
- Kingdom: Bacillati
- Phylum: Actinomycetota
- Class: Actinomycetes
- Order: Micromonosporales
- Family: Micromonosporaceae
- Genus: Actinoplanes
- Species: A. couchii

Binomial name
- Actinoplanes couchii Kämpfer et al. 2007

Type strain
- CCUG 53409; CIP 109316; DSM 45050; GW 8/1761; GW8-1761; JCM 15999; NBRC 106145

Species of bacterium

Actinoplanes couchii is a Gram-positive bacterium from the genus Actinoplanes which has been isolated from soil from the Marmore waterfalls in Italy.
