= Actinoplanes cibodasensis =

Scientific classification
- Domain: Bacteria
- Kingdom: Bacillati
- Phylum: Actinomycetota
- Class: Actinomycetia
- Order: Micromonosporales
- Family: Micromonosporaceae
- Genus: Actinoplanes
- Species: A. cibodasensis

Binomial name
- Actinoplanes cibodasensis Nurkanto et al. 2015

Type strain
- LIPI11-2-Ac042; InaCC A458; NBRC 110974

Species of bacterium

Actinoplanes cibodasensis is a bacterium from the genus Actinoplanes which has been isolated from leaf litter from the Cibodas Botanical Garden in Indonesia.
