= 1-Deoxynojirimycin =

Names
- Preferred IUPAC name (2R,3R,4R,5S)-2-(Hydroxymethyl)piperidine-3,4,5-triol

Identifiers
CAS Number	19130-96-2
3D model (JSmol)	Interactive image
ChEBI	CHEBI:44369
ChemSpider	27360
ECHA InfoCard	100.119.812
IUPHAR/BPS	4642
KEGG	D09605
PubChem CID	29435
UNII	FZ56898FLE
CompTox Dashboard (EPA)	DTXSID70172647
- InChI: InChI=1S/C6H13NO4/c8-2-3-5(10)6(11)4(9)1-7-3/h3-11H,1-2H2/t3-,4+,5-,6-/m1/s1 Key: LXBIFEVIBLOUGU-JGWLITMVSA-N
- SMILES: C1[C@@H]([C@H]([C@@H]([C@H](N1)CO)O)O)O

Properties
Chemical formula	C_{6}H_{13}NO_{4}
Molar mass	163.173 g·mol^{−1}
Melting point	195 °C (383 °F; 468 K)
- Except where otherwise noted, data are given for materials in their standard state (at 25 °C [77 °F], 100 kPa). Infobox references

1-Deoxynojirimycin (DNJ or 1-DNJ), also called duvoglustat or moranolin, is an alpha-glucosidase inhibitor, most commonly found in mulberry leaves. Although it can be obtained in small quantities by brewing an herbal tea from mulberry leaves, interest in commercial production has led to research on developing mulberry tea higher in DNJ, and on alternate routes of production, such as via Bacillus species.

== Biosynthesis ==
1-Deoxynojirimycin is a polyhydroxylated piperidine alkaloid produced from D-Glucose in various plants, such as Commelina communis, and in the Streptomyces and Bacillus bacteria. High quantities of this iminosugar are produced in Bacillus subtilis, a process initiated by a TYB gene cluster composed of gabT1 (aminotransferase), yktc1 (phosphatase), and gutB1 (oxidoreductase).

In Bacillus subtilis, D-glucose first undergoes glycolysis, opening the 6-member ring and producing fructose-6-phosphate. GabT1 catalyzes transamination at the C2 position, followed by a dephosphorylation by the Yktc1 enzyme, resulting in 2-amino-2-deoxy-D-mannitol (ADM), an essential precursor. Regio-selective oxidation by GutB1 occurs at the exposed C6 hydroxyl of ADM, pushing a C2-N-C6 cyclization of the resulting 6-oxo intermediate, creating manojirimycin (MJ). Epimerization of MJ at the C2 position yields the nojirimycin isomer. Nojirimycin is then dehydrated (loss of -OH at C1 position), along with reduction of the imine moiety. This results in the product 1-DNJ.

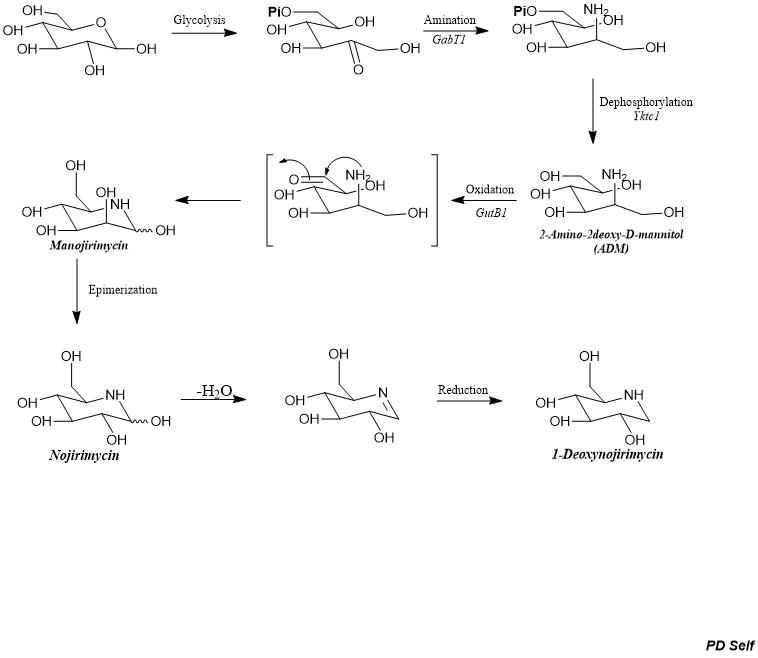
Biosynthesis of 1-deoxynojirimycin in Bacillus subtilis

=== Pathway variations ===
In the Streptomyces subrutilus species, a secondary pathway branching from the manojirimycin precursor results in 1-deoxymanojirimycin via dehydration and reduction of the isomer. However, Bacillus subtilis does not produce 1-deoxymanojirimycin despite the presence of the manojirimycin precursor.

Iminosugar biosynthesis in Commelina communis involves C1-C5 cyclisation of the original D-glucose precursor without the subsequent inversion.

== See also ==
- Nojirimycin
- 1-Deoxygalactonojirimycin, a stereoisomer of 1-deoxynojirimycin
