= Nojirimycin =

Names
- IUPAC name (3R,4S,5R,6R)-6-(Hydroxymethyl)-2,3,4,5-piperidinetetrol

Identifiers
CAS Number	15218-38-9
3D model (JSmol)	Interactive image
ChEBI	CHEBI:28945
ChemSpider	21864922
KEGG	C06763
PubChem CID	65242
UNII	W40512EP9K
- InChI: InChI=1S/C6H13NO5/c8-1-2-3(9)4(10)5(11)6(12)7-2/h2-12H,1H2/t2-,3-,4+,5-,6?/m1/s1 Key: BGMYHTUCJVZIRP-GASJEMHNSA-N
- SMILES: C([C@@H]1[C@H]([C@@H]([C@H](C(N1)O)O)O)O)O

Properties
Chemical formula	C_{6}H_{13}NO_{5}
Molar mass	179.172 g·mol^{−1}
- Except where otherwise noted, data are given for materials in their standard state (at 25 °C [77 °F], 100 kPa). Infobox references

Nojirimycin is the parent compound of a class of antibiotics and glucosidase inhibitors. Nojirimycin and its derivatives are mainly obtained from a class of Streptomyces species. Chemically, it is an iminosugar.

== Derivatives ==
- 1-Deoxynojirimycin or duvoglustat
- 1-Deoxygalactonojirimycin or migalastat, a drug for the treatment of Fabry disease
