= Cetoniacytone A =

Names
- IUPAC name N-[(1R,2S,6R)-2-Hydroxy-6-(hydroxymethyl)-5-oxo-7-oxabicyclo[4.1.0]hept-3-en-3-yl]acetamide

Identifiers
CAS Number	496775-48-5
3D model (JSmol)	Interactive image
ChEBI	CHEBI:84360
ChemSpider	8641204
KEGG	C17699
PubChem CID	10465793
CompTox Dashboard (EPA)	DTXSID901121234
- InChI: InChI=1S/C9H11NO5/c1-4(12)10-5-2-6(13)9(3-11)8(15-9)7(5)14/h2,7-8,11,14H,3H2,1H3,(H,10,12)/t7-,8+,9-/m0/s1 Key: JYYJQJKNUQRQSW-YIZRAAEISA-N
- SMILES: CC(=O)NC1=CC(=O)[C@]2([C@@H]([C@H]1O)O2)CO

Properties
Chemical formula	C_{9}H_{11}NO_{5}
Molar mass	213.189 g·mol^{−1}
- Except where otherwise noted, data are given for materials in their standard state (at 25 °C [77 °F], 100 kPa). Infobox references

Cetoniacytone A is a secondary metabolite classified in the family of C_{7}N aminocyclitols which include other natural products such as validamycin A, acarbose, and epoxyquinomicin. Cetoniacytone A was first identified from a culture of Actinomyces sp. (strain Lu 9419), an endosymbiotic Gram-positive bacillus found in the intestines of a rose chafer (Cetonia aureata). Preliminary feeding studies with [U-^{13}C_{3}]glycerol identified the core moiety, cetoniacytone, to be derived via the pentose phosphate pathway. Although agar plate diffusion assay studies of cetoniacytone A showed no antimicrobial activity against Gram-positive and Gram-negative bacteria, cetoniacytone A has demonstrated a significant growth inhibitory effect against human cancer cell lines including hepatocellular carcinoma (HEP G2) and breast adenocarcinoma (MCF 7).

== Biosynthesis ==
Feeding experiments conducted by Zeeck and co-workers established the synthesis of cetoniacytone A to proceed via the pentose phosphate pathway with sedoheptulose 7-phosphate as the key intermediate. Sedoheptulose 7-phosphate first undergoes a cyclization catalyzed by 2-epi-5-epi-valiolone synthase (CetA) yielding 2-epi-5-epi-valiolone. Following the cyclization, 2-epi-5-epi-valiolone epimerase (CetB) results in an inversion of the stereochemistry of the alcohol alpha to the ketone forming 5-epi-valiolone. Next, CetL, a type of oxidoreductase, results in the oxidation of the C-4 hydroxyl group to give 2-keto-5-epi-valiolone followed by a transamination catalyzed by aminotransferases CetM to give 2-amino-5-epi-valiolone. The sequential reactions depicted in the dashed box represent putative pathways that involve oxidoreductase, dehydrogenase, and hypothetical proteins related to the cupin superfamily to yield cetoniacytone B. Lastly, cetoniacytone B is acetylated via an arylamine N-acetyltransferase (CetD) to yield cetoniacytone A.

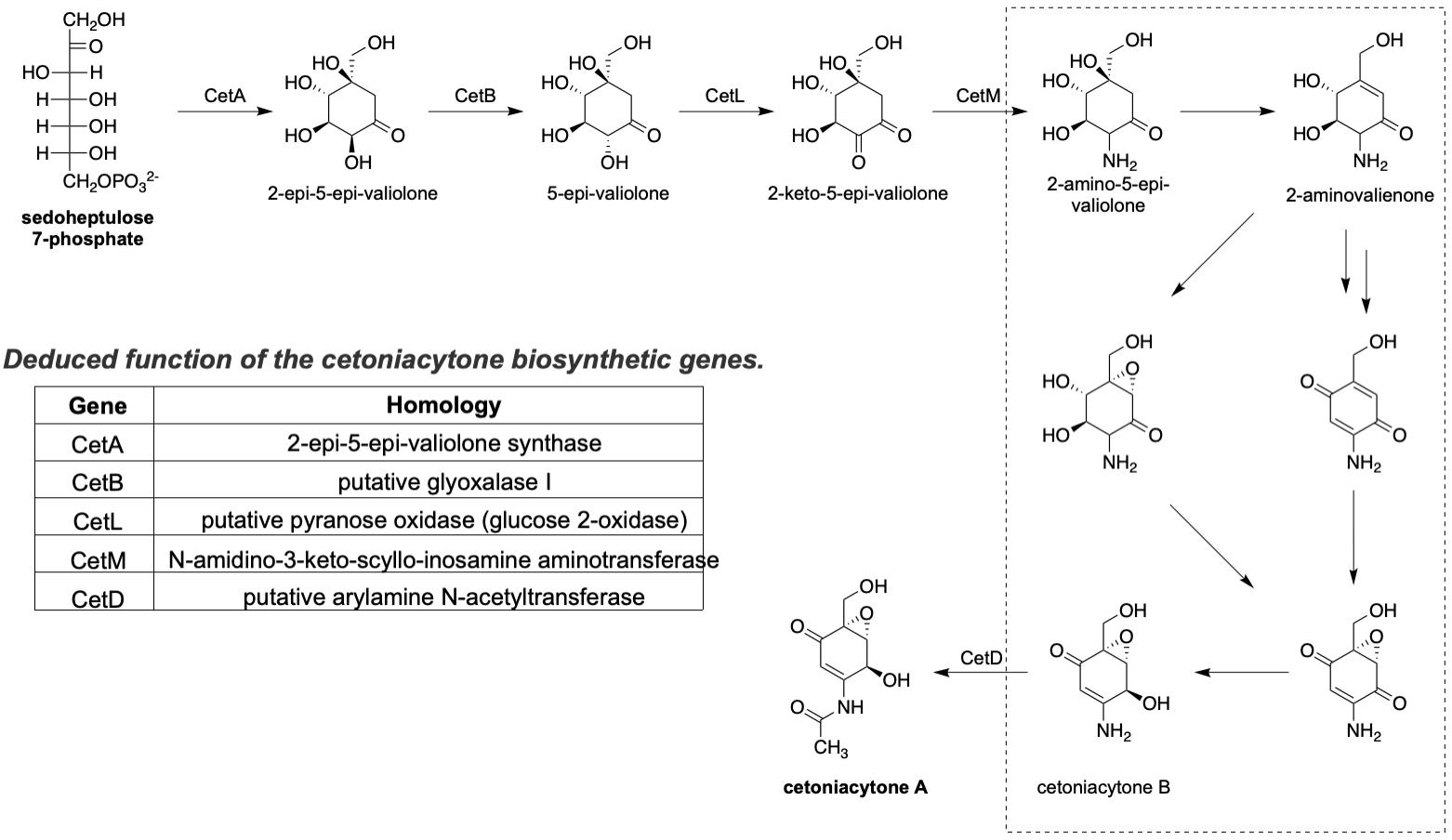
Figure 1. Biosynthesis of Cetoniacytone A from the Endosymbiotic Bacterium Actinomyces sp. Lu 9419.
