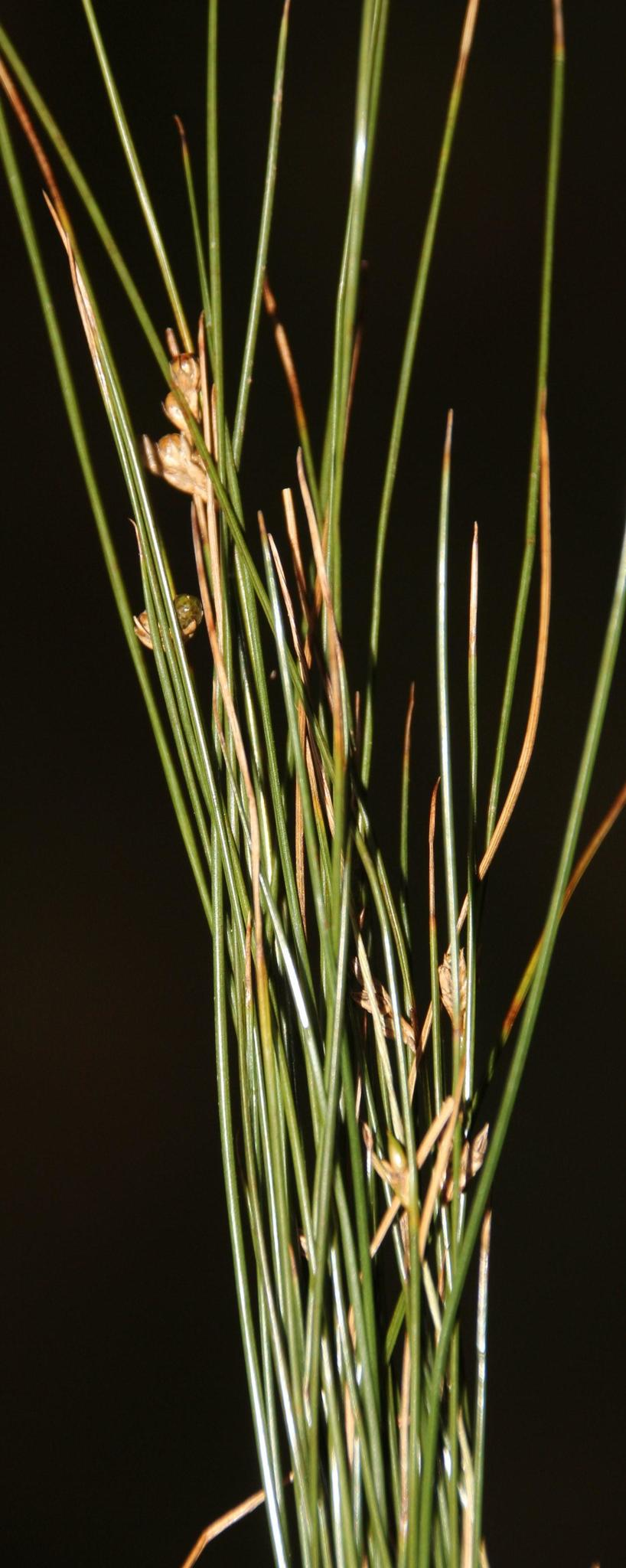

Scientific classification
- Kingdom: Plantae
- Clade: Embryophytes
- Clade: Tracheophytes
- Clade: Spermatophytes
- Clade: Angiosperms
- Clade: Monocots
- Clade: Commelinids
- Order: Poales
- Family: Juncaceae
- Genus: Juncus
- Species: J. capillaceus

Binomial name
- Juncus capillaceus Lam.

Synonyms
- Juncus capillaceus var. montevidensis Buchenau; Juncus tenuifolius Steud.

= Juncus capillaceus =

Species of plant

Juncus capillaceus is a rush species native to South America, but has been introduced to other parts of the world.

== Description ==
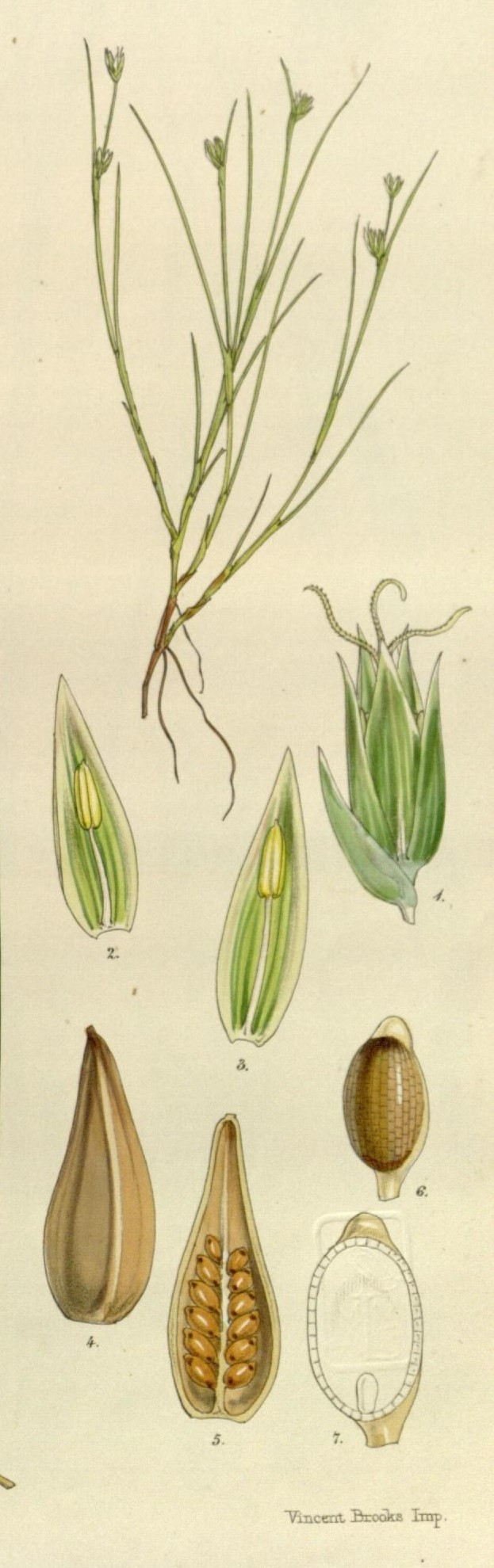
1) Fruit in perianth, 2) outer sepal and stamen, 3) inner sepal and stamen, 4) capsule, 5) valve of capsule and seeds, 6) seed, 7) vertical section of seed

This tufted perennial grows to be 30 cm (0.98 ft) tall. Woody roots grow from a horizontal rhizome and are densely covered in root hairs. The shoots grow close to each other and are fibrous at the base. Between one and three long, slender and cylindrical ribbed leaves grow from each shoot. These extend past the stems and the small red to brown flowers, which are borne in pseudolateral spikes. The inflorescences look like a continuation of the stem. Two to ten flowers occur on each inflorescence. The seeds are brown and round.

== Distribution ==
This species is native to South America. It is most common in Argentina, Chile and Uruguay. It has also been introduced in Australia, South Africa and Spain. In South Africa, it is known from disturbed areas in and around Cape Town. These include sites at Oranjezicht, Rhodes Memorial and Newlands.
