= Actinoplanes capillaceus =

Scientific classification
- Domain: Bacteria
- Kingdom: Bacillati
- Phylum: Actinomycetota
- Class: Actinomycetes
- Order: Micromonosporales
- Family: Micromonosporaceae
- Genus: Actinoplanes
- Species: A. capillaceus

Binomial name
- Actinoplanes capillaceus Matsumoto et al. 2001

Type strain
- DSM 44859; IFO 16408; JCM 10268; K95-5561; NBRC 16408

Species of bacterium

Actinoplanes capillaceus is a bacterium from the genus Actinoplanes which has been isolated from soil in Sayama, Japan.
