= Ramoplanin =

Antibiotic chemical

- Structure of Ramoplanin A2, with the variable acyl sidechain in blue.

Clinical data
- Routes of administration: Oral
- ATC code: none

Legal status
- Legal status: US: ℞-only

Identifiers
- CAS Number: 76168-82-6
- PubChem CID: 16132338
- ChemSpider: 17286439
- UNII: 0WX9996O2G
- KEGG: C12008
- ChEBI: CHEBI:29670
- ChEMBL: ChEMBL1095892
- ECHA InfoCard: 100.161.388

Chemical and physical data
- Formula: C_{119}H_{154}ClN_{21}O_{40}
- Molar mass: 2554.10 g·mol^{−1}
- 3D model (JSmol): Interactive image
- SMILES: C[C@@H]1C(=O)N[C@H](C(=O)O[C@@H]([C@@H](C(=O)N[C@@H](C(=O)N[C@@H](C(=O)N[C@@H](C(=O)N[C@H](C(=O)N[C@@H](C(=O)N[C@H](C(=O)N[C@H](C(=O)N[C@@H](C(=O)N[C@H](C(=O)N[C@@H](C(=O)N[C@H](C(=O)NCC(=O)N[C@H](C(=O)N1)CC(C)C)c2ccc(cc2)O)[C@@H](C)O)c3ccc(cc3)O[C@@H]4[C@H]([C@H]([C@@H]([C@H](O4)CO)O)O)O[C@@H]5[C@H]([C@H]([C@@H]([C@H](O5)CO)O)O)O)CCCN)Cc6ccccc6)[C@H](C)O)c7ccc(cc7)O)c8ccc(cc8)O)[C@@H](C)O)CCCN)c9ccc(cc9)O)NC(=O)[C@H](CC(=O)N)NC(=O)/C=C\C=C\CC(C)C)C(=O)N)c1ccc(c(c1)Cl)O
- InChI: InChI=1S/C119H154ClN21O40/c1-54(2)17-11-9-14-22-82(153)127-77(50-81(123)152)107(166)141-93-99(101(124)160)180-117(176)92(66-33-44-78(151)72(120)49-66)140-102(161)56(5)126-105(164)75(47-55(3)4)128-83(154)51-125-108(167)87(61-23-34-67(147)35-24-61)136-111(170)86(59(8)146)134-113(172)89(65-31-42-71(43-32-65)177-119-100(97(158)95(156)80(53-143)179-119)181-118-98(159)96(157)94(155)79(52-142)178-118)135-104(163)73(20-15-45-121)129-106(165)76(48-60-18-12-10-13-19-60)131-109(168)84(57(6)144)133-114(173)90(63-27-38-69(149)39-28-63)138-115(174)91(64-29-40-70(150)41-30-64)137-110(169)85(58(7)145)132-103(162)74(21-16-46-122)130-112(171)88(139-116(93)175)62-25-36-68(148)37-26-62/h9-14,18-19,22-44,49,54-59,73-77,79-80,84-100,118-119,142-151,155-159H,15-17,20-21,45-48,50-53,121-122H2,1-8H3,(H2,123,152)(H2,124,160)(H,125,167)(H,126,164)(H,127,153)(H,128,154)(H,129,165)(H,130,171)(H,131,168)(H,132,162)(H,133,173)(H,134,172)(H,135,163)(H,136,170)(H,137,169)(H,138,174)(H,139,175)(H,140,161)(H,141,166)/b11-9+,22-14-/t56-,57+,58-,59-,73-,74-,75+,76+,77+,79-,80-,84+,85-,86-,87+,88-,89+,90-,91+,92+,93+,94-,95-,96+,97+,98+,99+,100+,118-,119+/m1/s1; Key:KGZHFKDNSAEOJX-WIFQYKSHSA-N

Ramoplanin (INN) is a glycolipodepsipeptide antibiotic drug derived from strain ATCC 33076 of Actinoplanes. It is effective against Gram-positive bacteria.

== Medical uses ==
Its development has been fast-tracked by the U.S. Food and Drug Administration as a treatment for multiple antibiotic-resistant Clostridioides difficile infection of the gastrointestinal tract, Unlike vancomycin, it is absorbed in the gastrointestinal tract, although it is unstable in the bloodstream, so can be taken only orally against Clostridioides difficile infections of the gastrointestinal tract.

Ramoplanin is "particularly useful" in cases E. faecalis no matter its sensitivity to vancomycin.

== Mechanism of action ==
It exerts its bacteriocidal effect by inhibiting cell wall biosynthesis, acting by inhibiting the transglycosylation step of peptidoglycan synthesis. Ramoplanin specifically binds to and sequesters lipid intermediates I and II, preventing intracellular glycosyltransferase (MurG) and other steps of the peptidoglycan assembly system.

== Chemistry ==
Ramoplanin is a mixture of three related compounds that vary in the acyl group on the Asn N-terminus, with the most abundant form (shown in the infobox) being A2.

=== Biosynthesis ===
The biosynthesis is performed by a 33-gene cluster containing nonribosomal peptide synthetase genes and supporting enzymes for amino acid and fatty acid synthesis, revealed by sequencing of the producer strain in 2002. Initial investigation into the functions of individual genes was conducted in 2012.

=== Total synthesis ===
The general synthesis of Ramoplanin A1, A2 and A3 aglycons entails the preparation of residues 3-9 (heptapeptide 15), pentadepsipeptide 26 (residues 1, 2 and 15–17) along with pentapeptide 34 (residues 10–14), subsequent coupling, and cyclization to create the 49-membered aglycon core of the compound. The synthesis of Ramoplanin A2 aglycon and A3 aglycon are very similar to scheme 6, where ramoplanin A1 aglycon requires the corresponding acyl group and DMF, while ramoplanin A3 aglycon synthesis requires both Bu_{4}NF, i-PrOH, and then treatment with the acyl group and DMF.

Ramoplanin A2 Aglycon Synthesis

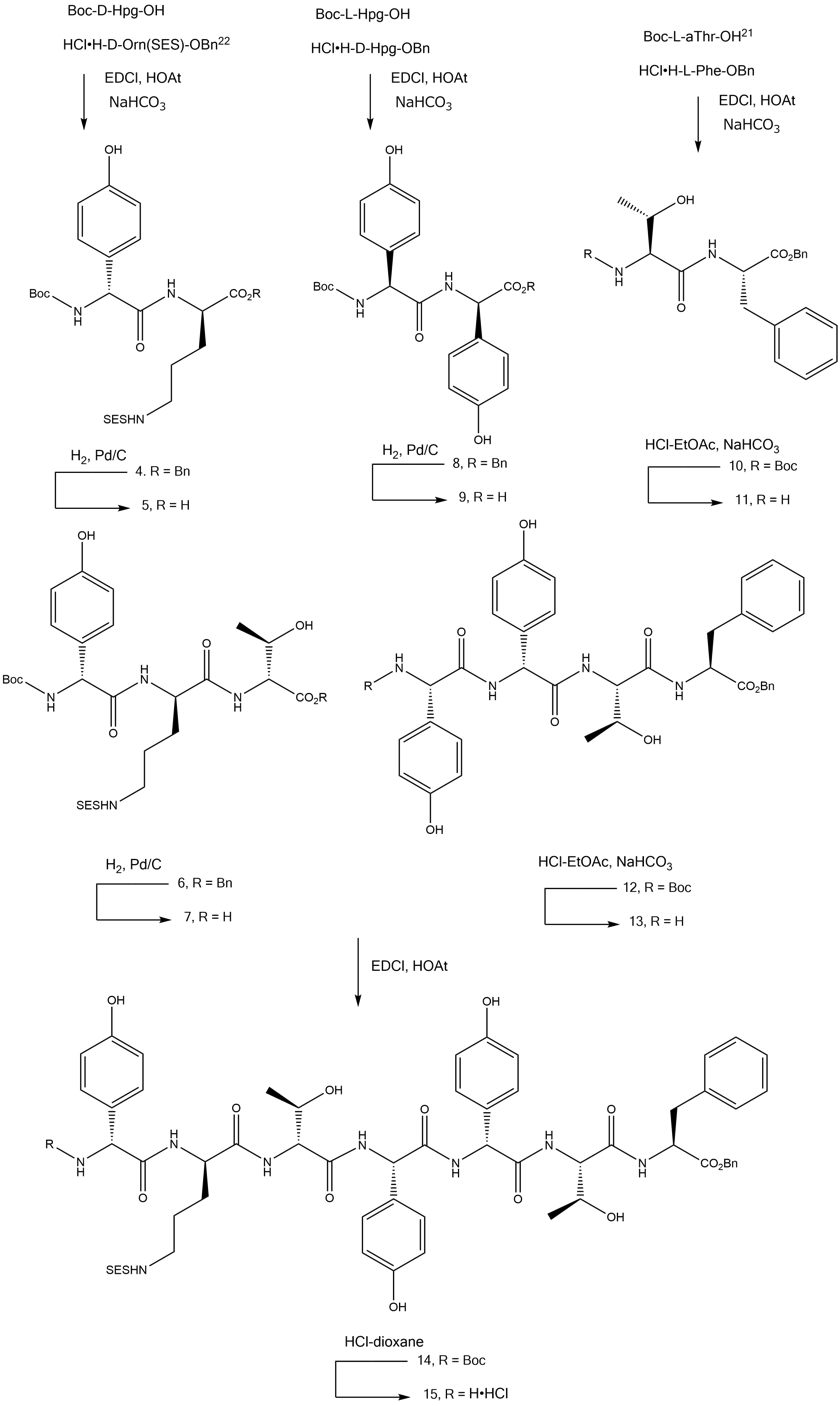
1 - Synthesis of Hpg3-Phe9 Subunit

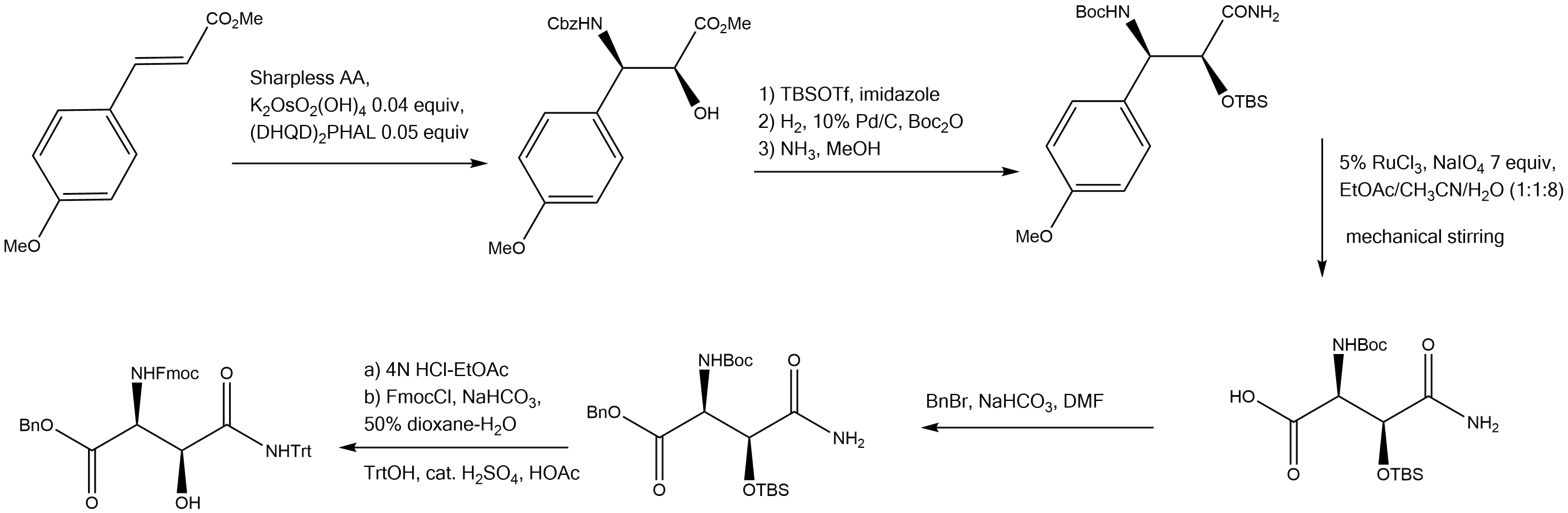
2 - Fmoc-L-HAsn(Trt)-Obn Preparation

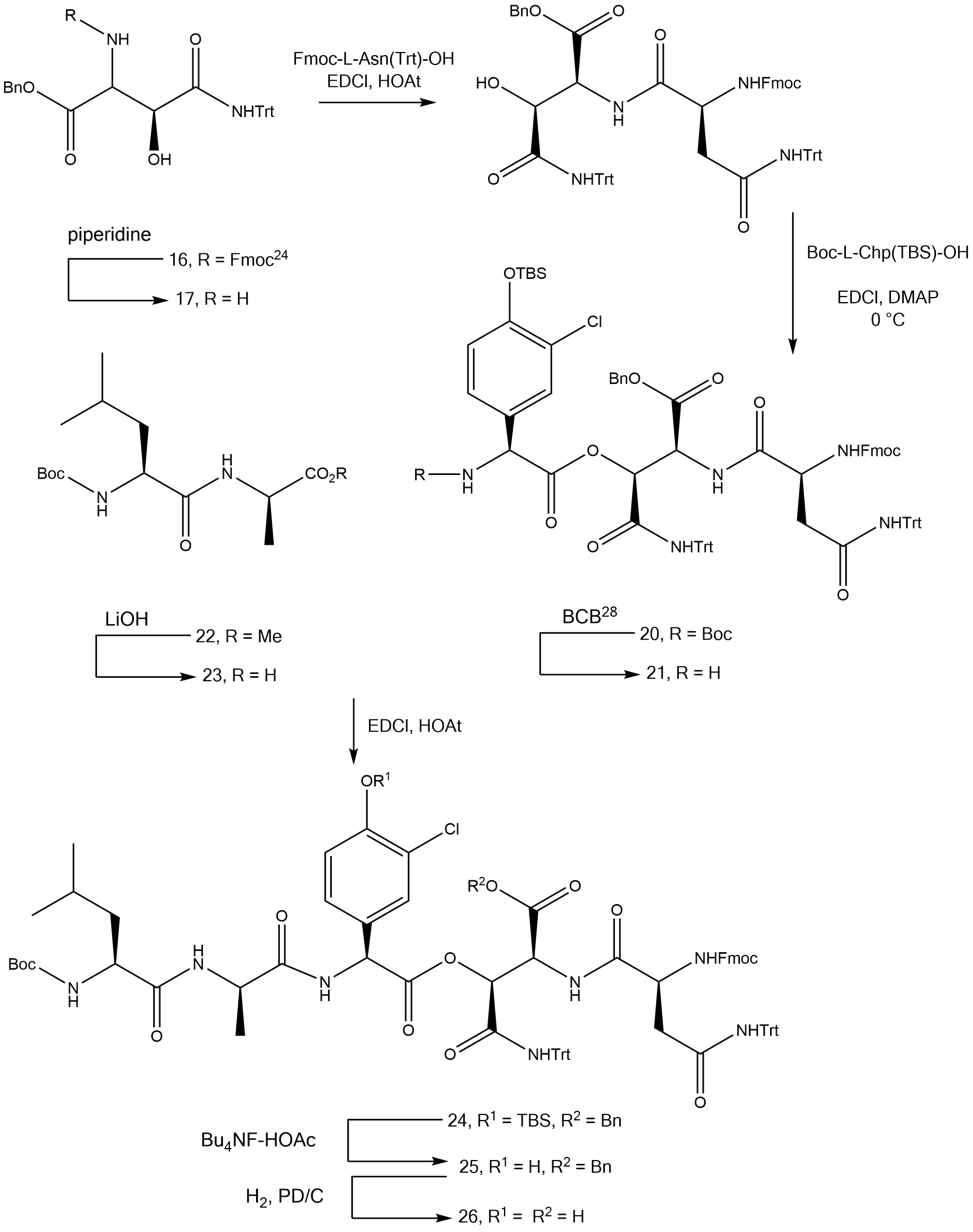
3 - Synthesis of Depsipeptide subunit

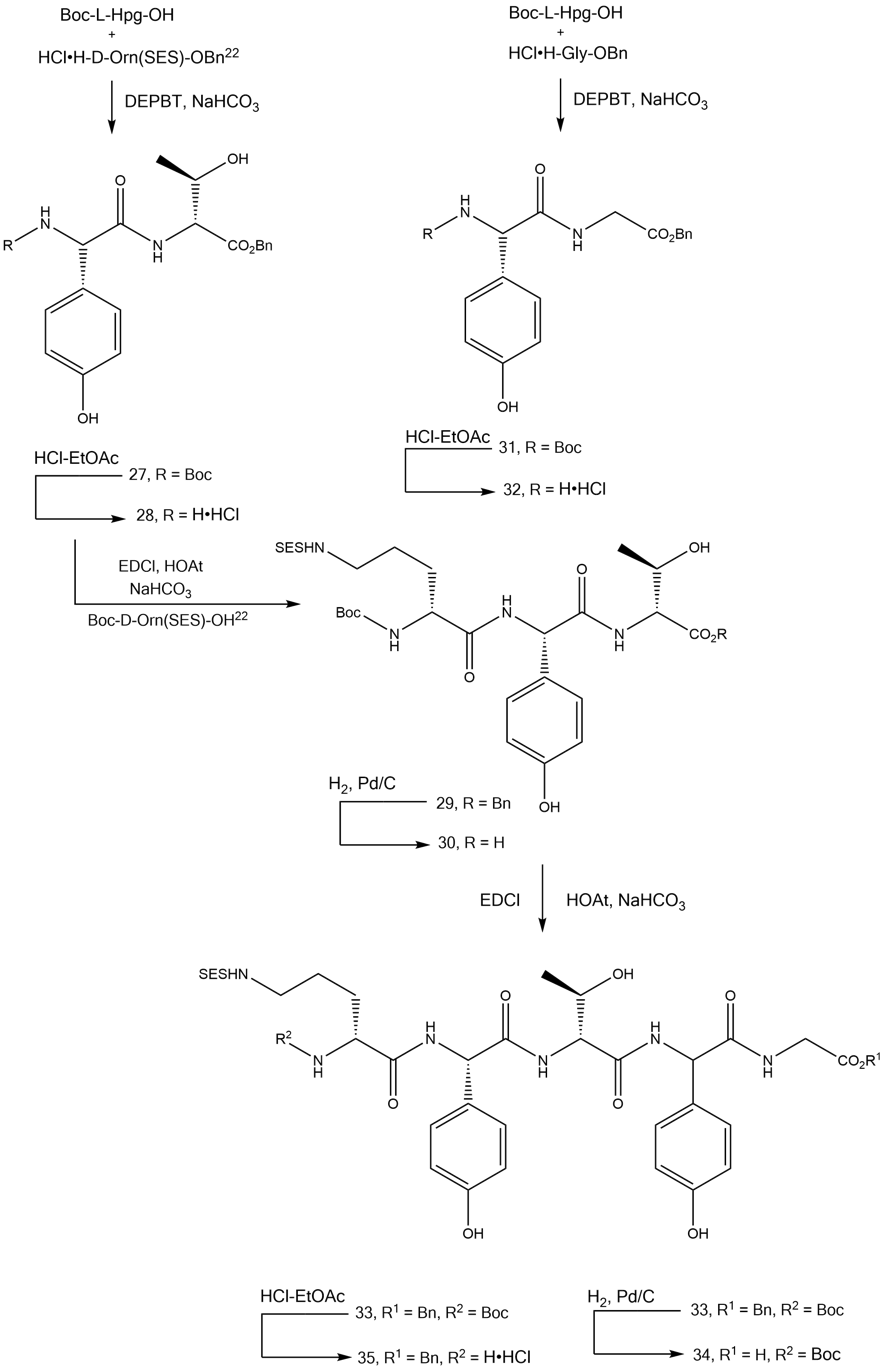
4 - Synthesis of Orn10-Gly14 Subunit

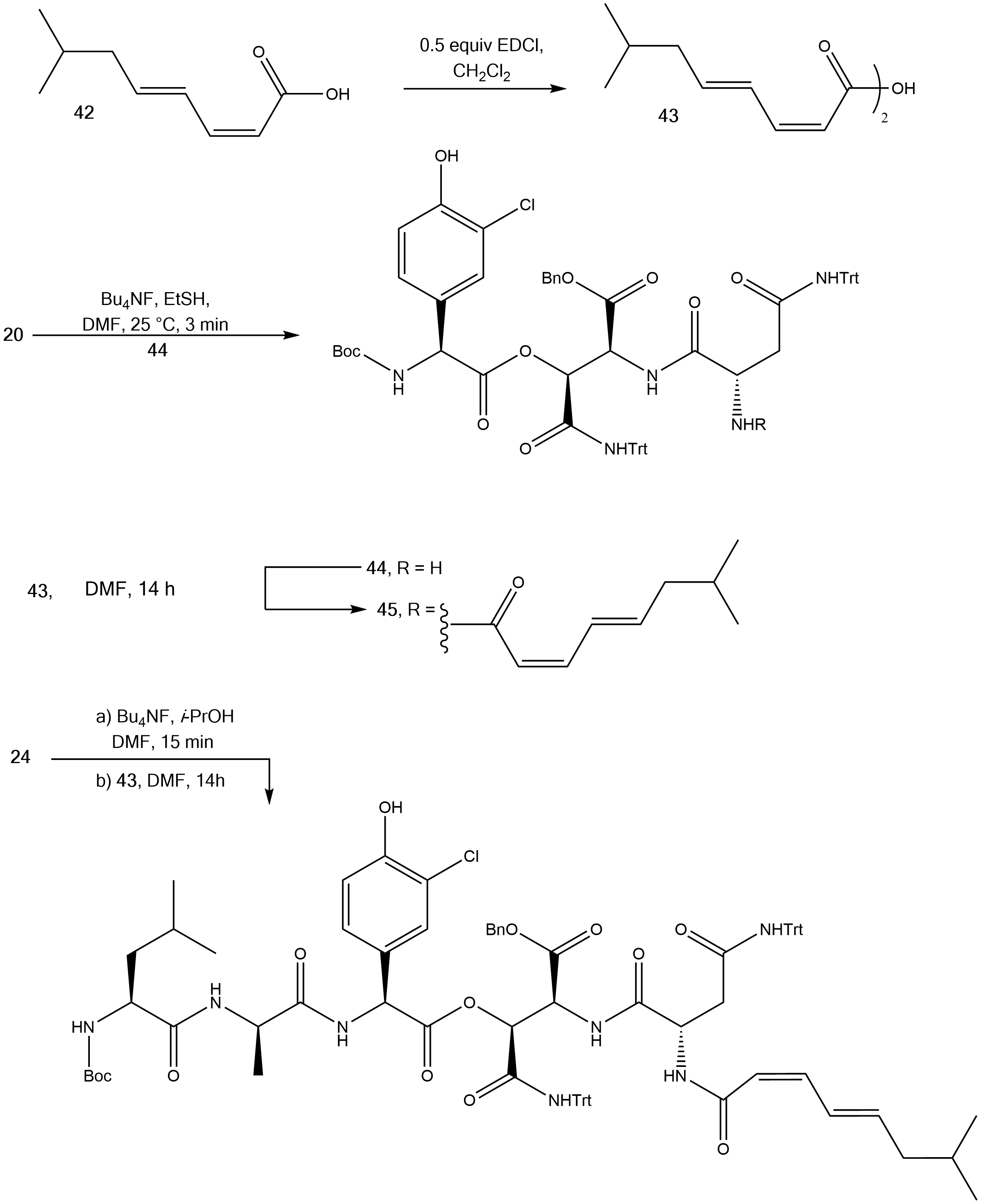
5 - Preparation of acyl group

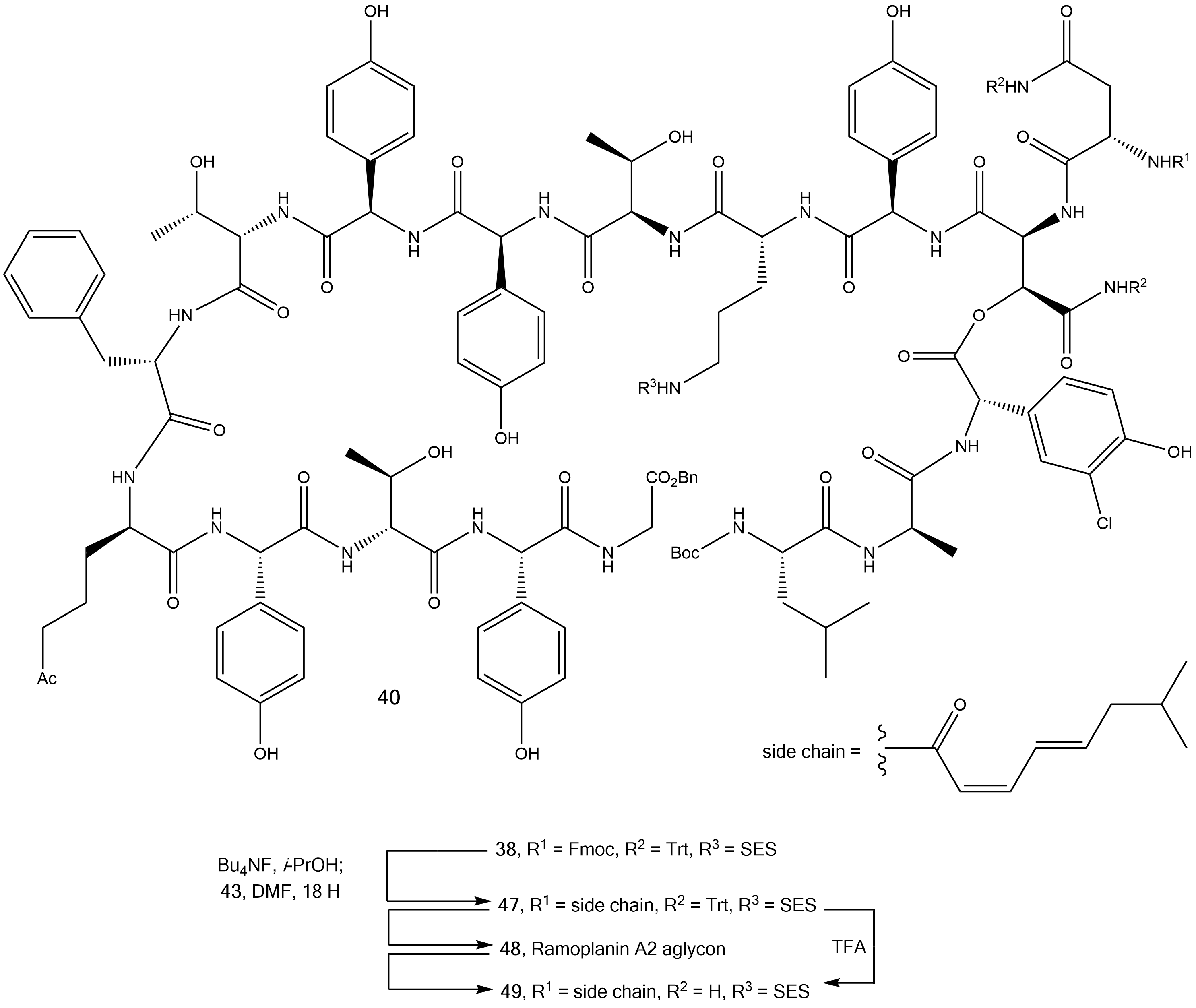
6 - Deprotection
