= Iminosugar =

Class of chemical compounds

The chemical structure of 1-deoxynojirimycin, an example of a simple iminosugar.

An iminosugar, also known as an iminosaccharide, is any analog of a sugar where a nitrogen atom has replaced the oxygen atom in the ring of the structure.

Iminosugars are common components of plants and may be responsible for some of their medicinal properties. The first iminosugar to be isolated from a natural source, 1-deoxynojirimycin (DNJ), found in Mulberry, was reported in 1976, but few others were discovered until many years later.

In terms of biochemical activity for medicinal applications, DNJ and 1,4-dideoxy-1,4-imino-D-arabinitol (DAB, another early example of this class of compounds) are alpha-glucosidase inhibitors and were shown to have anti-diabetic and anti-viral activity. DNJ was modified to produce two derivatives now used as medicines, N-hydroxyethyl-DNJ (miglitol) for diabetes and N-butyl-DNJ (miglustat) for Gaucher's disease. Anti-cancer and anti-viral activity was subsequently observed for swainsonine—a mannose analogue—and castanospermine—a glucose analogue—in the 1980s. More than 200 have now been reported from plants and micro-organisms. Although the early compounds had biological activities due to glycosidase inhibition, an increasing number are being shown to have therapeutic potential without being glycosidase inhibitors and may interact with sugar receptors in the body or chaperone deficient enzymes such as in lysosomal storage disorders or in cystic fibrosis.

== Structure and stability ==
The nitrogen of the iminosugar ring structure is a hemiaminal linkage, which, like the hemiacetal of a regular glycoside, is unstable. The 1-deoxy analogs of iminosugars are C-glycosides, with the nitrogen as part of an ordinary amine linkage. Their piperidine, pyrrolidine, or similar rings are stable.

== See also ==
- Amino sugar
