= Teicoplanin =

Pharmaceutical drug

Clinical data
- Pronunciation: /ˌtaɪkoʊˈpleɪnɪn/ TY-koh-PLAY-nin
- Trade names: Targocid
- AHFS/Drugs.com: International Drug Names
- Pregnancy category: AU: B3
- Routes of administration: Intravenous, intramuscular
- ATC code: J01XA02 (WHO)

Legal status
- Legal status: AU: S4 (Prescription only); UK: POM (Prescription only); EU: Rx-only

Pharmacokinetic data
- Bioavailability: 90% (given IM)
- Protein binding: 90% to 95%
- Metabolism: Nil
- Elimination half-life: 70 to 100 hours
- Excretion: Kidney (97% unchanged)

Identifiers
- IUPAC name: Ristomycin A 34-O-[2-(acetylamino)-2-deoxy-.beta.-D-glucopyranosyl]-22,31-dichloro-7-demethyl-64-O-demethyl-19-deoxy-56-O-[2-deoxy-2-[(8-methyl-1-oxononyl)amino]-.beta.-D-glucopyranosyl]-42-O-.alpha.-D-mannopyranosyl-
- CAS Number: 61036-62-2
- PubChem CID: 16129712
- DrugBank: DB06149
- ChemSpider: 16736197
- UNII: 4U3D3YY81M
- KEGG: D02142
- ChEMBL: ChEMBL415428
- NIAID ChemDB: 007693
- CompTox Dashboard (EPA): DTXSID4048642

Chemical and physical data
- Formula: Variable
- Molar mass: 1564.3 to 1907.7 g/mol
- Melting point: 260 °C (500 °F) (dec.)
- InChI: InChI=1S/C89H99Cl2N9O33/c1-34(2)9-7-5-4-6-8-10-61(109)95-69-75(114)72(111)59(32-102)130-88(69)133-79-56-26-41-27-57(79)127-53-18-14-39(24-48(53)91)78(132-87-68(93-35(3)104)74(113)71(110)58(31-101)129-87)70-85(122)99-67(86(123)124)46-29-43(106)30-55(128-89-77(116)76(115)73(112)60(33-103)131-89)62(46)45-23-38(13-15-50(45)107)64(82(119)100-70)97-84(121)66(41)98-83(120)65-40-21-42(105)28-44(22-40)125-54-25-37(12-16-51(54)108)63(92)81(118)94-49(80(117)96-65)20-36-11-17-52(126-56)47(90)19-36/h11-19,21-30,34,49,58-60,63-78,87-89,101-103,105-108,110-116H,4-10,20,31-33,92H2,1-3H3,(H,93,104)(H,94,118)(H,95,109)(H,96,117)(H,97,121)(H,98,120)(H,99,122)(H,100,119)(H,123,124)/t49-,58-,59-,60-,63+,64-,65+,66-,67-,68-,69-,70+,71-,72-,73-,74-,75-,76+,77+,78-,87+,88+,89+/m1/s1; Key:FHBQKTSCJKPYIO-OXIGXJDJSA-N

Teicoplanin is a glycopeptide antibiotic with a spectrum of activity similar to vancomycin. Its mechanism of action is to inhibit bacterial cell wall peptidoglycan synthesis. It is used in the prophylaxis and treatment of serious infections caused by Gram-positive bacteria, including methicillin-resistant Staphylococcus aureus and Enterococcus faecalis.

Teicoplanin is widely available in many European, Asian, and South American countries, however it is not currently approved by the US Food and Drug Administration and is not commercially available in the United States. Teicoplanin is marketed by Sanofi-Aventis under the trade name Targocid. Other trade names include Ticocin marketed by Cipla(India).

Its strength is considered to be due to the length of the hydrocarbon chain.

== History ==
Teicoplanin was first isolated in 1978 from Actinoplanes teichomyceticus (ATCC 31121), a rare species of actinobacteria in the family Micromonosporaceae. The bacteria were obtained from a soil sample collected in Nimodi Village, Indore, India. The chemical structure of teicoplanin was determined and published in 1984.

Teicoplanin was first introduced into clinical use in 1984. Following the publication of studies demonstrating its efficacy against infections such as bone and soft tissue infections, endocarditis, pneumonia, and sepsis in 1986, it received regulatory approval in Europe in 1988.

The biosynthetic pathway leading to teicoplanin, as well as the regulatory circuit governing the biosynthesis, were studied intensively in recent years, allowing for the creation of an integrated model of its biosynthesis.

== Indications ==
Teicoplanin treats a wide range of infections with Gram-positive bacteria, including endocarditis, sepsis, soft tissue and skin infections, and venous catheter-associated infections.

Studies have investigated the use of oral teicoplanin in the treatment of pseudomembranous colitis and Clostridioides difficile-associated diarrhea, finding it to demonstrate efficacy comparable to that of vancomycin.

=== Susceptible organisms ===
Teicoplanin has demonstrated in vitro efficacy against Gram-positive bacteria including staphylococci (including MRSA), streptococci, enterococci, and against anaerobic Gram-positive bacteria including Clostridium spp. Teicoplanin is ineffective against Gram-negative bacteria as the large, polar molecules of the compound are unable to pass through the external membrane of these organisms. The following represents MIC susceptibility data for a few medically significant pathogens:

- Clostridioides difficile: 0.06 μg/ml - 0.5 μg/ml
- Staphylococcus aureus: ≤0.06 μg/ml - ≥128 μg/ml
- Staphylococcus epidermidis: ≤0.06 μg/ml - 32 μg/ml

== Pharmacology ==
=== Pharmacokinetics ===
Due to poor oral absorption, teicoplanin requires intravenous or intramuscular administration for systemic effect. Intramuscular administration achieves approximately 90% bioavailability. The drug exhibits high protein binding (90-95%) and is primarily eliminated through the kidneys unchanged, with minimal liver metabolism (2-3%) via hydroxylation. Clearance is reduced in patients with kidney impairment and is not significantly removed by hemodialysis. Teicoplanin exhibits a long half-life of 45-70 hours, allowing for once-daily dosing after loading doses. Although teicoplanin is primarily approved for intravenous and intramuscular use, several clinical and pharmacokinetic studies have explored its administration via the subcutaneous route. Subcutaneous teicoplanin has been reported as a feasible alternative in selected patients, particularly in outpatient, frail, or palliative care settings. Available evidence suggests that subcutaneous administration achieves pharmacokinetic and pharmacodynamic exposures comparable to intravenous dosing after appropriate loading, with good local tolerability. However, this route of administration remains off-label.

=== Pharmacodynamics ===
Teicoplanin is a glycopeptide antibiotic that inhibits bacterial cell wall synthesis. It binds to the D-alanyl-D-alanine (D-Ala-D-Ala) terminus of the peptidoglycan precursor, preventing the transpeptidation reaction necessary for cell wall cross-linking. This binding also interferes with the polymerization of peptidoglycan, ultimately leading to cell death.

In addition to its binding to the D-Ala-D-Ala terminus, teicoplanin may also interact with the lipid II substrate in the bacterial cell membrane through its hydrophobic tail. This interaction could facilitate the antibiotic's proximity to the nascent peptidoglycan, enhancing its inhibitory effect. However, this mechanism has not been fully confirmed.

== Adverse effects ==
Adverse effects of teicoplanin are usually limited to local effects or hypersensitivity reactions. While there is potential for nephrotoxicity and ototoxicity, the incidence of such organ toxicity is rare if recommended serum concentrations are successfully maintained.

== Considerations ==
Reduced kidney function slows teicoplanin clearance, consequently increasing its elimination half-life. Elimination half-life is longer in the elderly due to the reduced kindey function in this population.

== Chemistry ==
Teicoplanin (TARGOCID, marketed by Sanofi Aventis Ltd) is actually a mixture of several compounds, five major (named teicoplanin A_{2}-1 through A_{2}-5) and four minor (named teicoplanin RS-1 through RS-4). All teicoplanins share a same glycopeptide core, termed teicoplanin A_{3}-1 — a fused ring structure to which two carbohydrates (mannose and N-acetylglucosamine) are attached. The major and minor components also contain a third carbohydrate moiety — β-D-glucosamine — and differ only by the length and conformation of a side-chain attached to it. Teicoplanin A_{2}-4 and RS-3 have chiral side chains while all other side chains are achiral. Teicoplanin A_{3} lacks both the side chains as well as the β-D-glucosamine moiety.

The structures of the teicoplanin core and the side-chains that characterize the five major as well as four minor teicoplanin compounds are shown below.

Teicoplanin core (left, black) and side-chains that characterize teicoplanins A_{2}-1 through A_{2}-5 (middle) as well as related RS-1 through RS-4 (right). In blue: β-D-glucosamine.

Teicoplanin refers to a complex of related natural products isolated from the fermentation broth of a strain of Actinoplanes teichomyceticus, consisting of a group of five structures. These structures possess a common aglycone, or core, consisting of seven amino acids bound by peptide and ether bonds to form a four-ring system. These five structures differ by the identity of the fatty acyl side-chain attached to the sugar. The origin of these seven amino acids in the biosynthesis of teicoplanin was studied by ^{1}H and ^{13}C nuclear magnetic resonance. The studies indicate amino acids 4-Hpg, 3-Cl-Tyr, and 3-chloro-β-hydroxytyrosine are derived from tyrosine, and the amino acid 3,5-dihydroxyphenylglycine (3,5-Dpg) is derived from acetate. Teicoplanin contains 6 non-proteinogenic amino acids and three sugar moieties, N-acyl-β-D-glucosamine, N-acetyl-β-D-glucosamine, and D-mannose.

=== Gene cluster ===
The study of the genetic cluster encoding the biosynthesis of teicoplanin identified 49 putative open reading frames (ORFs) involved in the compound's biosynthesis, export, resistance, and regulation. Thirty-five of these ORFs are similar to those found in other glycopeptide gene clusters. The function of each of these genes is described by Li and co-workers. A summary of the gene layout and purpose is shown below.

Gene layout. The genes are numbered. The letters L and R designate transcriptional direction. The presence of the * symbol means a gene is found after NRPs, which are represented by A, B, C, and D. Based on the figure from: Li, T-L.; Huang, F.; Haydock, S. F.; Mironenko, T.; Leadlay, P. F.; Spencer, J. B. Chemistry & Biology. 2004, 11, p. 109.

[11-L] [10-L] [9-R] [8-R] [7-R] [6-R] [5-R] [4-L][3-L] [2-L] [1-R] [A-R] [B-R] [C-R] [D-R] [1*-R] [2*-R] [3*-R] [4*-R] [5*-R] [6*-R] [7*-R] [8*-R] [9*-R] [10*-R] [11*-R] [12*-R] [13*-R] [14*-R] [15*-R] [16*-R] [17*-R] [18*-R] [19*-R] [20*-R] [21*-R] [22*-R] [23*-R] [24*-R] [25*-L] [26*-L] [27*-R] [28*-R] [29*-R] [30*-R][31*-R] [32*-L] [33*-L] [34*-R]

Enzyme produced by gene sequence	Regulatory proteins	Other enzymes	Resistant enzymes	Β-hydroxy-tyrosine and 4-hydroxy-phenylglycin biosynthetic enzymes	Glycosyl transferases	Peptide synthetases	P450 oxygenases	Halogenase	3,5-dihydroxy phenylglycin biosynthetic enzymes
Genes	11, 10, 3, 2, 15*, 16*, 31*	9, 8, 1*, 2*, 4*, 11*, 13*, 21*, 26*, 27*, 30*, 32*, 33*, 34*	7, 6, 5	4, 12*, 14*, 22*, 23*, 24*, 25*, 28*, 29*	1, 3*, 10*	A, B, C, D	5*, 6*, 7*, 9*	8*	17*, 18*, 19*, 20*, 23*

=== Heptapeptide backbone synthesis ===
The heptapeptide backbone of teicoplanin is assembled by the nonribosomal peptide synthetases (NRPSs) TeiA, TeiB, TeiC and TeiD. Together these comprise seven modules, each containing a number of domains, with each module responsible for the incorporation of a single amino acid. Modules 1, 4, and 5 activate L-4-Hpg as the aminoacyl-AMP, modules 2 and 6 activate L-Tyr, and modules 3 and 7 activate L-3,5-Dpg. The activated amino acids are covalently bound to the NRPS as thioesters by a phosphopantetheine cofactor, which is attached to the peptidyl carrier protein (PCP) domain. The enzyme bound amino acids are then joined by amide bonds by the action of the condensation (C) domain.

The heptapetide of teicoplanin contains 4 D-amino acids, formed by epimerization of the activated L-amino acids. Modules 2, 4 and 5 each contain an epimerization (E) domain which catalyzes this change. Module 1 does not contain an E domain, and epimerization is proposed to be catalysed by the C domain. In all, six of the seven total amino acids of the teicoplanin backbone are composed of nonproteinogenic or modified amino acids. Eleven enzymes are coordinatively induced to produce these six required residues. Teicoplanin contains two chlorinated positions, 2 (3-Cl-Tyr) and 6 (3-Cl-β-Hty). The halogenase Tei8* has been acts to catalyze the halogenation of both tyrosine residues. Chlorination occurs at the amino acyl-PCP level during the biosynthesis, prior to phenolic oxidative coupling, with the possibility of tyrosine or β-hydroxytyrosine being the substrate of chlorination. Hydroxylation of the tyrosine residue of module 6 also occurs in trans during the assembly of the heptapeptide backbone.

=== Modification after heptapeptide backbone formation ===
Once the heptapeptide backbone has been formed, the linear enzyme-bound intermediate is cyclized. Gene disruption studies indicate cytochrome P450 oxygenases as the enzymes that performs the coupling reactions. The X-domain in the final NRPS module is required to recruit the oxygenase enzymes. OxyB forms the first ring by coupling residues 4 and 6, and OxyE then couples residues 1 and 3. OxyA couples residues 2 and 4, followed by the formation of a C-C bond between residues 5 and 7 by OxyC. The regioselectivity and atropisomer selectivity of these probable one-electron coupling reactions has been suggested to be due to the folding and orientation requirements of the partially crossed-linked substrates in the enzyme active site. The coupling reactions are shown below.

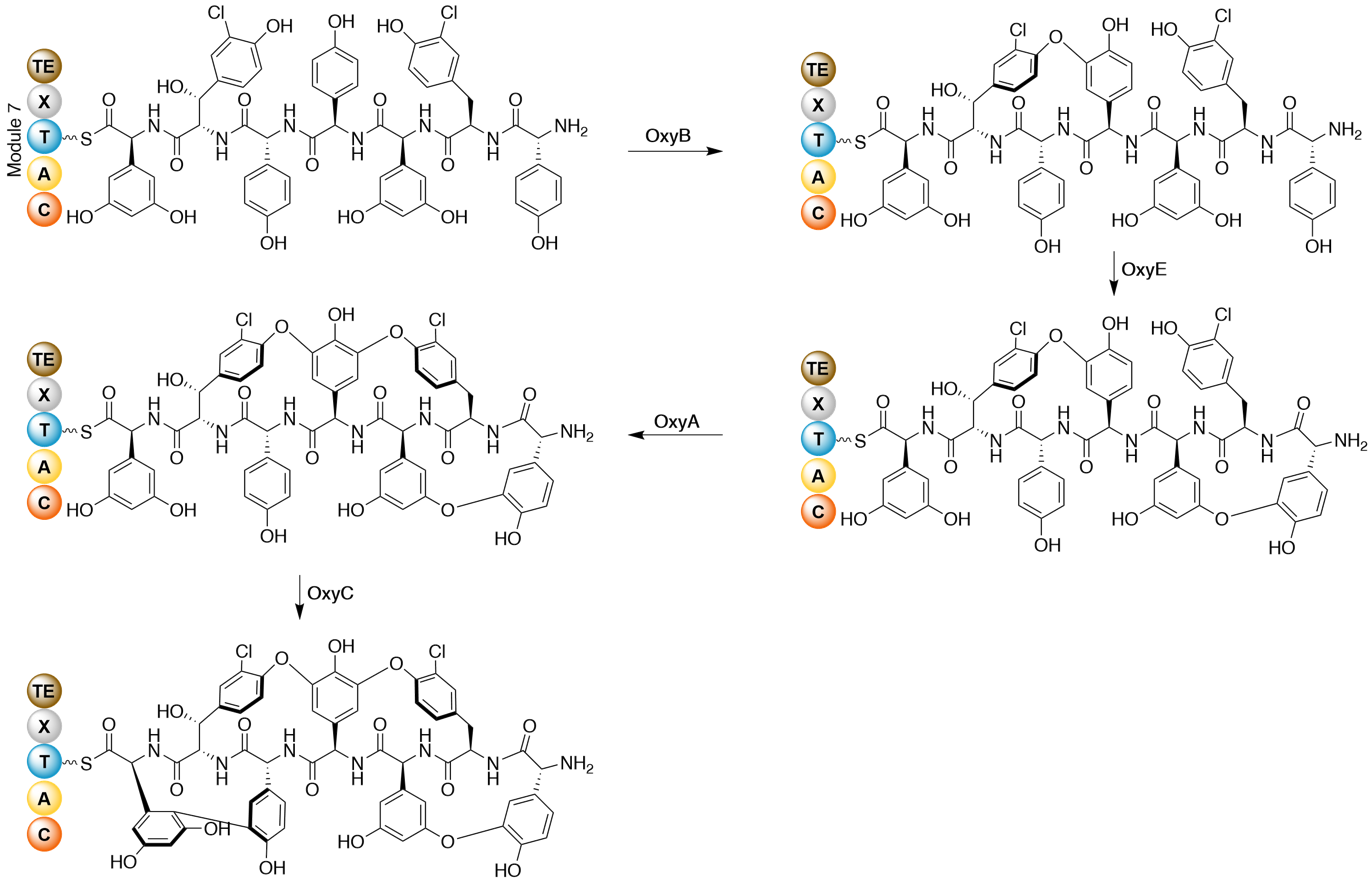
Oxidative cross-linkings steps during teicoplanin biosynthesis, catalysed by cytochrome P450 oxidases OxyB, E, A and C.

Specific glycosylation has been shown to occur after the formation of the heptpeptide aglycone. Three separate glycosyl transferases are required for the glycosylation of the teicoplanin aglycone. Tei10* catalyses the addition of GlcNAc to residue 4, followed by deacetylation by Tei2*. The acyl chain (produced by the action of Tei30* and Tei13*) is then added by Tei11*. Tei1 then adds a second GlcNAc to the β-hydroxyl group of residue 6, followed by mannosylation of residue 7 catalysed by Tei3*.

== Research ==
Researchers have explored the potential of teicoplanin as an antiviral agent against various viruses, including SARS-CoV-2. Laboratory studies indicate that teicoplanin inhibits cathepsin L, a host cell protease utilized by SARS-CoV-2 for cell entry via the endocytic pathway. In vitro experiments have demonstrated teicoplanin's ability to reduce SARS-CoV-2 infection, with reported IC_{50} values in the low micromolar range. This suggests potential efficacy against various SARS-CoV-2 variants due to conserved cathepsin L cleavage sites on the SARS-CoV-2 spike protein. Animal studies have also shown a protective effect against SARS-CoV-2 infection with teicoplanin pre-treatment.
