= Validamycin =

Names
- IUPAC name (1R,2R,3S,4S,6R)-2,3-Dihydroxy-6-(hydroxymethyl)-4-{[(1S,4S,5S,6S)-4,5,6-trihydroxy-3-(hydroxymethyl)cyclohex-2-en-1-yl]amino}cyclohexyl β-D-glucopyranoside
- Systematic IUPAC name (2R,3R,4S,5S,6R)-2-{[(1R,2R,3S,4S,6R)-2,3-Dihydroxy-6-(hydroxymethyl)-4-{[(1S,4S,5S,6S)-4,5,6-trihydroxy-3-(hydroxymethyl)cyclohex-2-en-1-yl]amino}cyclohexyl]oxy}-6-(hydroxymethyl)oxane-3,4,5-triol
- Other names Validamycin A; Valimon; Validacin

Identifiers
CAS Number	37248-47-8
3D model (JSmol)	Interactive image
ChEBI	CHEBI:29703
ChEMBL	ChEMBL520780
ChemSpider	16736085
ECHA InfoCard	100.120.044
EC Number	609-372-4
KEGG	C12112
PubChem CID	443629
UNII	313E9620QS
CompTox Dashboard (EPA)	DTXSID4058073
- InChI: InChI=1S/C20H35NO13/c22-3-6-1-8(12(26)15(29)11(6)25)21-9-2-7(4-23)19(17(31)13(9)27)34-20-18(32)16(30)14(28)10(5-24)33-20/h1,7-32H,2-5H2/t7-,8+,9+,10-,11+,12+,13+,14-,15+,16+,17-,18-,19-,20+/m1/s1 Key: JARYYMUOCXVXNK-IMTORBKUSA-N; InChI=1/C20H35NO13/c22-3-6-1-8(12(26)15(29)11(6)25)21-9-2-7(4-23)19(17(31)13(9)27)34-20-18(32)16(30)14(28)10(5-24)33-20/h1,7-32H,2-5H2/t7-,8+,9+,10-,11+,12+,13+,14-,15+,16+,17-,18-,19-,20+/m1/s1 Key: JARYYMUOCXVXNK-IMTORBKUBD
- SMILES: OC/C3=C/[C@H](N[C@H]2C[C@H](CO)[C@@H](O[C@@H]1O[C@H](CO)[C@@H](O)[C@H](O)[C@H]1O)[C@H](O)[C@H]2O)[C@H](O)[C@@H](O)[C@H]3O

Properties
Chemical formula	C_{20}H_{35}NO_{13}
Molar mass	497.494 g·mol^{−1}
- Except where otherwise noted, data are given for materials in their standard state (at 25 °C [77 °F], 100 kPa). Infobox references

Validamycin is an antibiotic and fungicide produced by Streptomyces hygroscopicus. An inhibitor of trehalase, validamycin is used for the control of sheath blight of rice and damping-off of cucumbers.

== See also ==
- Ralstonia solanacearum
