= C6H12O4 =

The molecular formula C_{6}H_{12}O_{4} (molar mass: 148.15 g/mol, exact mass: 148.073559) may refer to:

- Abequose
- Acetone peroxide dimer
- Colitose
- Cyclohexanetetrols
  - 1,2,3,4-Cyclohexanetetrol
  - 1,2,3,5-Cyclohexanetetrol
  - 1,2,4,5-Cyclohexanetetrol
- 2,3-Dihydroxy-3-methylpentanoic acid
- Kethoxal
- Mevalonic acid
- Pantoic acid
