= C7H14O6 =

The molecular formula C_{7}H_{14}O_{6} (molar mass : 194.18 g/mol, exact mass : 194.079038 u) may refer to:

- Bornesitol, a cyclitol
- Methyl-α-D-galactose
- Methylglucoside, a glucose derivative
- Ononitol, a cyclitol
- Pinitol, a cyclitol
- Quebrachitol, a cyclitol
- Sequoyitol
