= Cyclohexane-1,2,3,4,5,6-hexol =

Family of sugars with a six-carbon ring

- cis-Inositol

Names
- IUPAC name cyclohexane-1,2,3,4,5,6-hexol
- Systematic IUPAC name Cyclohexane-1,2,3,4,5,6-hexol
- Other names Inositol

Identifiers
CAS Number	87-89-8
3D model (JSmol)	Interactive image
ChEBI	CHEBI:17268
ChEMBL	ChEMBL1222251
ChemSpider	10239179
IUPHAR/BPS	4495
KEGG	D08079
PubChem CID	892
UNII	4L6452S749
- InChI: InChI=1S/C6H12O6/c7-1-2(8)4(10)6(12)5(11)3(1)9/h1-12H/t1-,2-,3-,4+,5-,6- Key: CDAISMWEOUEBRE-GPIVLXJGSA-N; InChI=1/C6H12O6/c7-1-2(8)4(10)6(12)5(11)3(1)9/h1-12H/t1-,2-,3-,4+,5-,6- Key: CDAISMWEOUEBRE-GPIVLXJGBG
- SMILES: O[C@@H]1[C@@H](O)[C@H](O)[C@H](O)[C@H](O)[C@H]1O

Properties
Chemical formula	C_{6}H_{12}O_{6}
Molar mass	180.16 g/mol

Related compounds
Related compounds	Phytic acid; 1,2,3,4,5-Cyclopentanepentol; Dodecahydroxycyclohexane; Benzenehexol; Hexachlorocyclohexane
- Except where otherwise noted, data are given for materials in their standard state (at 25 °C [77 °F], 100 kPa). Infobox references

Cyclohexane-1,2,3,4,5,6-hexol is a family of chemical compounds with formula C_{6}H_{12}O_{6}, whose molecule consists of a ring of six carbon atoms, each bound to one hydrogen atom and one hydroxyl group (–OH). There are nine stereoisomers, that differ by the position of the hydroxyl groups relative to the mean plane of the ring. All these compounds are sometimes called inositol, although this name (especially in biochemistry and related sciences) most often refers to a particular isomer, myo-inositol, which has many important physiological roles and medical uses.

These compounds are classified as sugars, specifically carbocyclic sugars or sugar alcohols, to distinguish them from the more common aldoses like glucose. They generally have sweet taste.

These compounds form several esters with biochemical and industrial importance, such as phytic acid and phosphatidylinositol phosphate,

== Isomers and structure ==
The nine stereoisomers of cyclohexane-1,2,3,4,5,6-hexol are distinguished by prefixes: myo-, scyllo-, muco-, D-chiro-, L-chiro-, neo-, allo-, epi-, and cis-inositol.

As their names indicate, L- and D-chiro inositol are chiral, a pair of enantiomers (mirror-image forms). All the others are meso compounds (indistinguishable from their mirror images).

myo-
scyllo-
muco-
neo-
allo-
epi-

cis-
D-chiro-
L-chiro-

=== Racemate ===
The designation rac-chiro-inositol has been used for the racemic mixture (racemate) of equal parts of the two chiro isomers. It crystallizes as a single phase, rather than separate D and L crystals, that melts at 250 °C (which is 4–5 °C higher than the melting point of the pure enantiomers) and decomposes between 308 and 344 °C. The crystal structure is monoclinic with the $P2_1/c$ group. The crystal cell parameters are a = 1014.35 pm, b = 815.42 pm, c = 862.39 pm, β = 92.3556°, Z = 4. The cell volume is 0.71270 nm^{3}, or about 0.178 nm^{3} per molecule (which is a bit smaller than the typical volumes of other isomers).

=== Ring conformation ===
As in cyclohexane, the C6 ring of these compounds can be in two conformations, "boat" and "chair". The relative stability of the two forms varies with the isomer, generally favoring the conformation where the hydroxyls are farthest apart from each other.

=== Melting points ===
Some of the stereoisomers crystallize in more than one polymorph, with different densities and melting points — which range from 225 °C for myo-inositol to about 360 °C for polymorph "B" of scyllo-inositol. There is a clear correlation between the melting points and the number and type of chains of hydrogen-bonded hydroxyls.

== Biochemistry ==
All isomers except allo- and cis- occur in nature, although myo-inositol is substantially more abundant and important than the others.

In humans, myo-inositol is synthesized mostly in the kidneys, from glucose 6-phosphate. Small amounts of myo-inositol are then converted by a specific epimerase to D-chiro-inositol, which is an important messenger molecule in insulin signaling.

A 2020 study found detectable amounts of epi-, neo-, chiro-, scyllo-, and myo-inositol in the urine of women, pregnant or not. Concentrations of myo and scyllo increased significantly in the third trimester of pregnancy, with scyllo varying between 20% and 40% of myo. Concentrations of epi, neo, and chiro were always a few percent of those of myo, except that chiro- reached 20% of myo in the second trimester of pregnancy.

The bacterium Bacillus subtilis can metabolize myo-, scyllo-, and D-chiro-inositol and convert to and from these three isomers.

=== Phytic acids ===
myo-Inositol hexakis-dihidrogenphosphate, or phytic acid

Plants synthesize inositol hexakis-dihydrogenphosphate, also called phytic acid or IP6, as a storage of phosphorus Inositol penta- (IP5), tetra- (IP4), and triphosphate (IP3) are also called "phytates"
