= Scyllo-Inositol =

scyllo-Inositol

Names
- IUPAC name scyllo-inositol
- Systematic IUPAC name (1R,2R,3R,4R,5R,6R)-cyclohexane-1,2,3,4,5,6-hexol
- Other names scyllitol; cocositol; quercinitol; 1,3,5/2,4,6-hexahydroxycyclohexane; scyllo-cyclohexanehexol; ELND005; AZD-103

Identifiers
CAS Number	488-59-5
3D model (JSmol)	Interactive image
ChemSpider	10254646
ECHA InfoCard	100.113.358
EC Number	610-437-4
IUPHAR/BPS	4649
UNII	1VS4X81277
CompTox Dashboard (EPA)	DTXSID50905091
- InChI: InChI=1S/C6H12O6/c7-1-2(8)4(10)6(12)5(11)3(1)9/h1-12H/t1-,2-,3+,4+,5-,6- Key: CDAISMWEOUEBRE-CDRYSYESSA-N; InChI=1/C6H12O6/c7-1-2(8)4(10)6(12)5(11)3(1)9/h1-12H/t1-,2-,3+,4+,5-,6- Key: CDAISMWEOUEBRE-CDRYSYESBJ
- SMILES: O[C@H]1[C@H](O)[C@@H](O)[C@H](O)[C@@H](O)[C@@H]1O

Properties
Chemical formula	C_{6}H_{12}O_{6}
Molar mass	180.156 g·mol^{−1}
Appearance	White crystalline solid
Density	1.57 (A), 1.66 (B) g/ml,
Melting point	358 °C (A), 360 °C (B) decomposes
- Except where otherwise noted, data are given for materials in their standard state (at 25 °C [77 °F], 100 kPa). verify (what is ?) Infobox references

scyllo-Inositol, also called scyllitol, cocositol, or quercinitol, is a chemical compound with formula C_{6}H_{12}O_{6}, one of the nine inositols, the stereoisomers of cyclohexane-1,2,3,4,5,6-hexol. The molecule has a ring of six carbon atoms, each bound to one hydrogen atom and one hydroxyl group (–OH); if the ring is assumed horizontal, the hydroxyls lie alternately above and below the respective hydrogens.

scyllo-Inositol is a naturally occurring carbohydrate, specifically a sugar alcohol. It occurs in small amounts in the tissues of humans and other animals, certain bacteria, and more abundantly in some plants.

Around 2000, scyllo-inositol attracted attention as a possible treatment for neurodegenerative disorders such as Alzheimer's. For this use it received the codes AZD-103 and ELND005.

== Chemical and physical properties ==
=== Crystal structure ===
Anhydrous scyllo-inositol exists in at least two polymorphs (crystal forms). In both forms the molecules have symmetry $\bar 1$ and are in the chair conformation, that puts all the hydroxyls in nearly equatorial positions.

The "A" form readily crystallizes from water. It has a lower density 1.57 g/ml and decomposes at 358 °C. It crystallizes in the monoclinic system with group is $P2_1/c$. The cell parameters are a = 508.9 pm, b = 664.5 pm, c = 1194.8 pm, β = 116.98°, Z = 2. The ring puckering parameter Q is 58.1 pm.

The "B" form is hard to obtain in pure form, as it often crystallizes mixed with the "A" form. Its density is 1.66 g/ml and decomposes at about 360 °C. Its crystal system is triclinic with group $P\bar 1$. The cell parameters are a = 672.5 pm, b = 679.7 pm, c = 863.5 pm, α = 95.45°, β = 99.49°, γ = 99.19°, Z = 2. The puckering Q is 56.6 pm.

The density of the "A" form is similar to that of myo-inositol but about 0.05 to 0.10 g/mL lower than that of the other inositol stereoisomers, and of the "B" form. The melting (decomposition) point of both forms is the highest among all inositols. Like all of them, the crystals feature infinite chains of hydrogen bonds.

=== Synthesis ===
Scyllitol and other stereo isomers can be synthesized from para-benzoquinone via a conduritol intermediate. It can also be obtained from myo-inositol by the Mitsunobu reaction.

Various animals, plants, insects, and bacteria have been found to convert myo-inositol to scyllo-inositol, including Streptomyces griseus, where that conversion is part of the synthesis of streptomycin.

Scyllitol was known to be a facultative intermediate in the metabolism of myo-inositol by the bacterium Bacillus subtilis. In 2011 a genetically engineered strain of this organism was developed which interrupted that pathway and converted part of the myo-inositol in the medium to scyllo-inositol in 48 hours. Eventually the process was able to produce 27.6 g/L of scyllo-inositol in the medium, from 50 g/L of myo-inositol, in 48 h.

In 2021 another process was developed using the bacterium Corynebacterium glutamicum, producing 1.8 g/L of scyllitol from 20 g/L glucose and 4.4 g/L from 20 g/L sucrose in 72 h. The conversion involves NAD+-dependent oxidation of myo-inositol to 2-keto-myo-inositol (scyllo-inosose), followed by NADPH-dependent reduction to scyllitol.

=== Derivatives ===
Several derivatives of scyllo-inositol have been synthesized and studied in the laboratory, such as phosphates (variants of phytic acid) and orthoformates with an adamantane structure.

== Biochemistry ==
=== Natural occurrence ===
Scyllitol is widely distributed in nature in fish, insects, mammalian tissues and urine, certain bacteria, and plants such as Calycanthus occidentalis. It is particularly abundant in coconut milk.

The scyllitol derivative O-methyl-scyllo-inositol is one of the predominant soluble carbohydrate derivatives in the root nodules of the pea plant created by the bacterium Rhizobium leguminosarum, together with the isomer ononitol (4-O-methyl-myo-inositol), which are not found elsewhere in the plant.

Scyllitol hexakis dihydrogenphosphate, the scyllo isomer of phytic acid (but not lower phosphates) has been detected in pasture soils from England and Wales at concentrations up to 130 mg of phosphorus per kg of soil, accounting for up to 15% of the soil organic phosphorus. The ratio of the scyllo isomer to the myo isomer ranged between 0.29 and 0.79.

The concentration of scyllo-inositol in coconut milk (the fluid inside the fruit of Cocos nucifera) is 0.5 g/L, five times that of myo-inositol.

=== Physiology ===
The concentration of scyllo-inositol in human brain can be measured by NMR; typical values are 0.35 mM for white matter, 0.4 mM for grey matter and 0.5 mM for cerebellum Another study compared the concentrations of myo and scyllo-inositol in brains of 24 healthy volunteers. Averages were about 0.36 mM for scyllo and 4.31 mM for myo, with large deviations. The study found a significant increase of both isomers in the older 14 (46-71 yrs) compared to the younger 10 (26-29 yrs), namely about 40% for scyllo, 20% for myo; and a weak correlation between the two values. However a concentration of scyllo-inositol 300% higher than normal was measured in a healthy volunteer, without a corresponding increase in myo-inositol; suggesting that metabolism of the two isomers are independently regulated.

Researchers at the Harvard Medical School-affiliated McLean Hospital found that chronic users of anabolic steroids had lower levels of brain scyllo-inositol levels than non-users.

Brain concentration of scyllo-inositol was found to be about 75% lower than average in patients with hepatic encephalopathy, which also lowers the levels of myo-inositol.

Scyllitol was found to inhibit in vitro the aggregation of α-synuclein into fibrils, a phenomenon implicated in Parkinson's disease.

Previous intravenous administration of either myo- or scyllo-inositol was found to reduce the duration and intensity of chemically induced seizures in rats.

Since the 1940s, 5–20% of coconut milk has been used as a growth-promoting agent in formulations of plant cell culture medium. Part of its effectiveness in this application is due to its myo- and scyllo-inositol contents.

== Clinical evaluation ==
=== Alzheimer's disease ===
In the early 2000s it was reported that scyllo–inositol crossed blood-brain barrier and, when given to mice (TgCRND8) that were genetically engineered to exhibit Alzheimers-like symptoms, it inhibited cognitive deficits and significantly improved the disease pathology. The compound was found to decrease the amount of insoluble amyloid proteins Aβ40, Aβ42 and amyloid plaque accumulation in the brain, without interfering with the synthesis of phosphatidylinositol lipids from myo-inositol. More recently, it has also been found to inhibit the binding of Aβ oligomers to plasma membranes and interfering with synaptic function.

Motivated by these and other results, in about 2008 Transition Therapeutics set to investigate scyllo-inositol as a disease-modifying therapy for Alzheimer's disease, under the designation AZD-103. Transition partnered with Elan Corporation for the development of the compound, relabeled ELND005, and a patent for this use (U.S. patent 7,521,481) was issued on April 21, 2009. In 2014, ELND005 reverted to Transition Therapeutics, which was acquired by OPKO Health in 2016.

A clinical investigation of ELND005 with approximately 353 patients, planned to take 18 months, was started in 2008 and received fast track designation from the U.S. Food and Drug Administration. The study initially used daily doses of 500, 2000, and 4000 mg; however, the last two were discontinued by December 2009, due to suspected adverse effects, including 9 deaths. Results of this trial were not positive but considered inconclusive. A new 12-week fast-track trial with 296 moderate to advanced Alzheimer's was started in November 2012, to investigate the effect of a single dose of ELND005 on the NPI-C agitation and aggression scores. In June 2015, the results of this trial were reported as negative, and the company abandoned plans to extend the trial further.

=== Bipolar disorder ===
In 2012, Elan started a Phase 2 study of AZD-103 as an add-on therapy in 400 patients with bipolar disorder; this program was discontinued in 2014.

=== Down's syndrome ===
In 2013, a four-week Phase 2 trial began evaluating 250 and 500 mg daily of AZD-103 in 23 young adults with Down's syndrome. This trial was completed in November 2014, without significant positive results, and was considered inconclusive.

== See also ==
- List of investigational bipolar disorder drugs
- allo-Inositol
- cis-Inositol
- D-chiro-Inositol
- epi-Inositol
- L-chiro-Inositol
- muco-Inositol
- neo-Inositol
