= C8H16O6 =

The molecular formula C_{8}H_{16}O_{6} (molar mass: 208.21 g/mol, exact mass: 208.0947 u) may refer to:

- Pinpollitol
- Viscumitol
