= 1L-chiro-Inositol =

Names
- IUPAC name 1L-chiro-Inositol
- Systematic IUPAC name (1R,2R,3R,4R,5S,6S)-Cyclohexane-1,2,3,4,5,6-hexol
- Other names (−)-1,2,4/3,5,6-inositol L-(−)-chiro-Inositol

Identifiers
CAS Number	551-72-4
3D model (JSmol)	Interactive image
ChEBI	CHEBI:27374
ChemSpider	10199754
ECHA InfoCard	100.008.183
UNII	63GQX5QW03
- InChI: InChI=1S/C6H12O6/c7-1-2(8)4(10)6(12)5(11)3(1)9/h1-12H/t1-,2-,3-,4-,5+,6+/m1/s1 Key: CDAISMWEOUEBRE-SHFUYGGZSA-N
- SMILES: O[C@@H]1[C@H](O)[C@@H](O)[C@@H](O)[C@H](O)[C@H]1O

Properties
Chemical formula	C_{6}H_{12}O_{6}
Molar mass	180.156 g·mol^{−1}
Melting point	230 °C (decomposes)
Solubility in water	485 g/L
Chiral rotation ([α]_{D})	20/ −60°, c=1.3 in H2O
- Except where otherwise noted, data are given for materials in their standard state (at 25 °C [77 °F], 100 kPa). verify (what is ?) Infobox references

The chemical compound 1L-chiro-inositol (often called L-chiro-inositol or LCI) is one of the nine stereoisomers of cyclohexane-1,2,3,4,5,6-hexol, with formula C_{6}H_{12}O_{6}, the generic "inositol". Its molecule has a ring of six carbon atoms, each bonded to a hydrogen atom and a hydroxyl group (–OH). Imagining the ring is horizontal, the hydroxyls on carbons 1, 2, and 4, in clockwise order are above the respective hydrogens, while the other three are below them.

The compound occurs in the human body and other organisms, together with its enantiomer (mirror image isomer) 1D-chiro-inositol (DCI), but at a much lower concentration than the main isomer myo-inositol.

== Structure ==
L-chiro-inositol crystallizes in the monoclinic system, group P2_{1}, with cell dimensions a = 686.7 pm, b = 913.3 pm, c = 621.7 pm (±0.004 pm) angle β = 106.59° (± 0.04°), molecular count Z = 2. The molecule has the expected chair conformation, with puckering parameters Q = 56.1 pm, θ = 4.4°, φ = 51.2°. The non-hydrogen molecular symmetry is close to C_{2}. The C–C bond lengths range from 151.5 to 152.8 pm, and the C–O bond lengths from 141.8 to 143.6 pm. The C–C–C angles range from 109.7 to 113.1°, and the C–C–O angles from 106.5 to 112.0°.

== Laboratory synthesis ==
L-chiro-inositol can be prepared from myo-inositol. It can be prepared also from para-benzoquinone by enzymatic action on a derived conduritol B intermediate; or by controlled oxidation of cyclohexa-3,5-diene-1,2-diol.

Another viable method is decomposition of plant-sourced quebrachitol, which can be obtained in good quantity from natural rubber serum (NRS), the liquid remaining from coagulation of latex from Hevea brasiliensis.

== Natural occurrence ==
L-chiro-inositol occurs, together with the D- isomer, in phospholipids of animal tissues. Analysis of rat tissues shows predominance of DCI in fat, liver, brain and kidney, and approximately equal amounts of DCI and LCI in muscles. L-chiro-inositol is also found in plants and parasites as quebrachitol, an ester of LCI — specifically, 2-O-methyl-L-chiro-inositol.

L-chiro-inositol can be extracted from dead leaf material from the seagrass Syringodium filiforme that washes up as flotsam on Caribbean beaches. Yeld of 2.3–2.5% of dry weight has been reported.

Microbial action in soil incubated for 12 days at 70% moisture converted about 4% of the at converted about 4% of infused myo-inositol to chiro-inositol of unspecified (D or L) optical activity.

== See also ==
- allo-Inositol
- cis-Inositol
- 1D-chiro-Inositol
- epi-Inositol
- muco-Inositol
- neo-Inositol
- scyllo-Inositol
