= Neo-Inositol =

neo-Inositol

Names
- IUPAC name neo-Inositol
- Systematic IUPAC name (1R,2R,3s,4S,5S,6s)-cyclohexane-1,2,3,4,5,6-hexol
- Other names (1s,2R,3R,4s,5S,6S)-cyclohexane-1,2,3,4,5,6-hexol; 1,2,3/4,5,6-cyclohexanehexol

Identifiers
CAS Number	488-54-0
3D model (JSmol)	Interactive image
ChEBI	CHEBI:25492
ChemSpider	10199749
UNII	8LQ63P85IC
- InChI: InChI=1S/C6H12O6/c7-1-2(8)4(10)6(12)5(11)3(1)9/h1-12H/t1-,2-,3-,4-,5-,6- Key: CDAISMWEOUEBRE-DCLYFUHFSA-N
- SMILES: O[C@H]1[C@@H](O)[C@H](O)[C@H](O)[C@H](O)[C@H]1O

Properties
Chemical formula	C_{6}H_{12}O_{6}
Molar mass	180.156 g·mol^{−1}
Appearance	white crystalline solid
Density	1.697 g/ml (from X-ray structure)
Melting point	315 °C; 599 °F; 588 K

Hazards
- Occupational safety and health (OHS/OSH)
Main hazards	Irritating to eyes, respiratory system and skin.
- Except where otherwise noted, data are given for materials in their standard state (at 25 °C [77 °F], 100 kPa). verify (what is ?) Infobox references

The chemical compound neo-inositol is one of the nine stereoisomers cyclohexane-1,2,3,4,5,6-hexol, the "inositols". Its formula is C_{6}H_{12}O_{6}; the six carbon atoms form a ring, each of them is bonded to a hydrogen atom and a hydroxyl group (–OH). If the ring is assumed horizontal, three consecutive hydroxyls lie above the respective hydrogens, and the other three lie below them.

Like the other stereoisomers, neo-inositol is considered a carbohydrate, specifically a sugar alcohol (to distinguish it from the more familiar ketose and aldose sugars, like glucose). It occurs in nature, but only in small amounts; usually much smaller than those of myo-inositol, the most important stereoisomer.

== Chemical and physical properties ==
=== Crystal structure ===
neo-Inositol crystallizes in the triclinic system with group $P\bar 1$. The cell parameters are a = 479.9 pm, b = 652.0 pm, c = 650.5 pm, α = 70.61°, β = 69.41°, γ = 73.66°, Z = 1, with molecular symmetry $\bar 1$. The cell volume is 0.176 nm^{3}. The ring has the chair conformation with puckering parameter Q = 60.9 pm.

== Synthesis ==
neo-Inositol can be obtained from para-benzoquinone via conduritol intermediates.

== Natural occurrence and biological roles ==
Small amounts of neo-inositol can be deteceted in human urine.

== See also ==
- allo-Inositol
- cis-Inositol
- D-chiro-Inositol
- L-chiro-Inositol
- epi-Inositol
- muco-Inositol
- scyllo-Inositol
