= Inositol 3-methyltransferase =

Identifiers
- EC no.: 2.1.1.39
- CAS no.: 37257-05-9

Databases
- IntEnz: IntEnz view
- BRENDA: BRENDA entry
- ExPASy: NiceZyme view
- KEGG: KEGG entry
- MetaCyc: metabolic pathway
- PRIAM: profile
- PDB structures: RCSB PDB PDBe PDBsum
- Gene Ontology: AmiGO / QuickGO
Search
- PMC: articles
- PubMed: articles
- NCBI: proteins

Inositol 3-methyltransferase (EC 2.1.1.39) is an enzyme that catalyzes the chemical reaction

inositol
+ SAM
(+)-bornesitol
+ SAH

This is a methylation reaction in which inositol is converted to (+)-bornesitol. The methyl group comes from the cofactor, S-adenosyl methionine (SAM), which loses its methyl group and becomes S-adenosyl-L-homocysteine (SAH).

The enzyme belongs to the family of transferases, specifically those transferring one-carbon group methyltransferases. The systematic name of this enzyme class is S-adenosyl-L-methionine:1D-myo-inositol 3-O-methyltransferase. Other names in common use include inositol L-1-methyltransferase, myo-inositol 1-methyltransferase, S-adenosylmethionine:myo-inositol 1-methyltransferase, myo-inositol 1-O-methyltransferase (name based on 1L-numbering, system and not 1D-numbering), and S-adenosyl-L-methionine:myo-inositol 1-O-methyltransferase. This enzyme participates in inositol phosphate metabolism.

== See also ==
- Inositol 1-methyltransferase which converts inositol to the enantiomer, (–)-bornesitol
