= Phosphatidylinositol a-mannosyltransferase =

Class of enzymes

phosphatidylinositol alpha-mannosyltransferase

Identifiers
- EC no.: 2.4.1.57
- CAS no.: 37277-65-9

Databases
- IntEnz: IntEnz view
- BRENDA: BRENDA entry
- ExPASy: NiceZyme view
- KEGG: KEGG entry
- MetaCyc: metabolic pathway
- PRIAM: profile
- PDB structures: RCSB PDB PDBe PDBsum
- Gene Ontology: AmiGO / QuickGO
Search
- PMC: articles
- PubMed: articles
- NCBI: proteins

In enzymology, a phosphatidylinositol alpha-mannosyltransferase (EC 2.4.1.57) is an enzyme that catalyzes the chemical reaction in which at least one alpha-D-mannose residues are transferred from GDP-mannose to positions 6, 2 and others in 1-phosphatidyl-myo-inositol.

This enzyme belongs to the family of glycosyltransferases, specifically the hexosyltransferases. The systematic name of this enzyme class is GDP-mannose:1-phosphatidyl-1D-myo-inositol alpha-D-mannosyltransferase. Other names in common use include GDP mannose-phosphatidyl-myo-inositol alpha-mannosyltransferase, GDPmannose:1-phosphatidyl-myo-inositol alpha-D-mannosyltransferase, guanosine diphosphomannose-phosphatidyl-inositol, alpha-mannosyltransferase, and phosphatidyl-myo-inositol alpha-mannosyltransferase.
