= Inositol 4-methyltransferase =

Identifiers
- EC no.: 2.1.1.129

Databases
- IntEnz: IntEnz view
- BRENDA: BRENDA entry
- ExPASy: NiceZyme view
- KEGG: KEGG entry
- MetaCyc: metabolic pathway
- PRIAM: profile
- PDB structures: RCSB PDB PDBe PDBsum
- Gene Ontology: AmiGO / QuickGO
Search
- PMC: articles
- PubMed: articles
- NCBI: proteins

Inositol 4-methyltransferase (EC 2.1.1.129) is an enzyme that catalyzes the chemical reaction

inositol
+ SAM
ononitol
+ SAH

This is a methylation reaction in which inositol (myo-inositol) is converted to ononitol. The methyl group comes from the cofactor, S-adenosyl methionine (SAM), which becomes S-adenosyl-L-homocysteine (SAH). The enzyme has been characterised from Mesembryanthemum crystallinum and Vigna umbellata.

This enzyme belongs to the family of transferases, specifically those transferring one-carbon group methyltransferases. The systematic name of this enzyme class is S-adenosyl-L-methionine:1D-myo-inositol 4-methyltransferase. Other names in common use include myo-inositol 4-O-methyltransferase, S-adenosyl-L-methionine:myo-inositol 4-O-methyltransferase, and myo-inositol 6-O-methyltransferase.
