= Indoleacetylglucose—inositol O-acyltransferase =

indoleacetylglucose-inositol O-acyltransferase

Identifiers
- EC no.: 2.3.1.72
- CAS no.: 74082-57-8

Databases
- IntEnz: IntEnz view
- BRENDA: BRENDA entry
- ExPASy: NiceZyme view
- KEGG: KEGG entry
- MetaCyc: metabolic pathway
- PRIAM: profile
- PDB structures: RCSB PDB PDBe PDBsum
- Gene Ontology: AmiGO / QuickGO
Search
- PMC: articles
- PubMed: articles
- NCBI: proteins

In enzymology, an indoleacetylglucose-inositol O-acyltransferase (EC 2.3.1.72) is an enzyme that catalyzes the chemical reaction

1-O-(indol-3-yl)acetyl-beta-D-glucose + myo-inositol $\rightleftharpoons$ D-glucose + O-(indol-3-yl)acetyl-myo-inositol

Thus, the two substrates of this enzyme are 1-O-(indol-3-yl)acetyl-beta-D-glucose and myo-inositol, whereas its two products are D-glucose and O-(indol-3-yl)acetyl-myo-inositol.

This enzyme belongs to the family of transferases, specifically those acyltransferases transferring groups other than aminoacyl groups. The systematic name of this enzyme class is 1-O-(indol-3-yl)acetyl-beta-D-glucose:myo-inositol (indol-3-yl)acetyltransferase. Other names in common use include indole-3-acetyl-beta-1-D-glucoside:myo-inositol, indoleacetyltransferase, 1-O-(indol-3-ylacetyl)-beta-D-glucose:myo-inositol, and indole-3-ylacetyltransferase.
