= D-pinitol dehydrogenase =

Identifiers
- EC no.: 1.1.1.142
- CAS no.: 37250-71-8

Databases
- IntEnz: IntEnz view
- BRENDA: BRENDA entry
- ExPASy: NiceZyme view
- KEGG: KEGG entry
- MetaCyc: metabolic pathway
- PRIAM: profile
- PDB structures: RCSB PDB PDBe PDBsum
- Gene Ontology: AmiGO / QuickGO
Search
- PMC: articles
- PubMed: articles
- NCBI: proteins

In enzymology, D-pinitol dehydrogenase (EC 1.1.1.142) is an enzyme that catalyzes the chemical reaction

pinitol
+ NADP^{+}
H^{+}
H^{+}
2D-5-O-methyl-2,3,5/4,6-pentahydroxycyclohexanone
+ NADPH

The two substrates of this enzyme are pinitol and oxidised nicotinamide adenine dinucleotide phosphate (NADP^{+}). Its products are 2D-5-O-methyl-2,3,5/4,6-pentahydroxycyclohexanone, reduced NADPH, and a proton.

This enzyme belongs to the family of oxidoreductases, specifically those acting on the CH-OH group of donor with NAD^{+} or NADP^{+} as acceptor. The systematic name of this enzyme class is 1D-3-O-methyl-chiro-inositol:NADP^{+} oxidoreductase. This enzyme is also called 5D-5-O-methyl-chiro-inositol:NADP^{+} oxidoreductase.
