= C5H10O5 =

The molecular formula C_{5}H_{10}O_{5} may refer to:

- Apiose
- Aldopentoses
  - Arabinose
  - Lyxose
  - Ribose
  - Xylose
- 1,2,3,4,5-Cyclopentanepentol
- Ketopentoses
  - Ribulose
  - Xylulose
