= Cyclohexanetetrol =

A cyclohexanetetrol is a chemical compound consisting of a cyclohexane molecule with four hydroxyl groups (–OH) replacing four of the twelve hydrogen atoms. It is therefore a cyclitol (cyclic polyol). Its generic formula is C_{6}H_{12}O_{4} or C_{6}H_{8}(OH)_{4}.

Some cyclohexanetetrols have biologically important roles in some organisms.

== Isomers ==
There are several cyclohexanetetrol isomers that differ on the position of the hydroxyl groups along the ring, and on their orientation relative to the mean plane of the ring.

The isomers with each hydroxyl on a distinct carbon are:

- 1,2,3,4-Cyclohexanetetrol or ortho- (10 isomers, including 4 enantiomer pairs)
- 1,2,3,5-Cyclohexanetetrol or meta- (8 isomers, including 2 enantiomer pairs)
- 1,2,4,5-Cyclohexanetetrol or para- (7 isomers, including 2 enantiomer pairs)
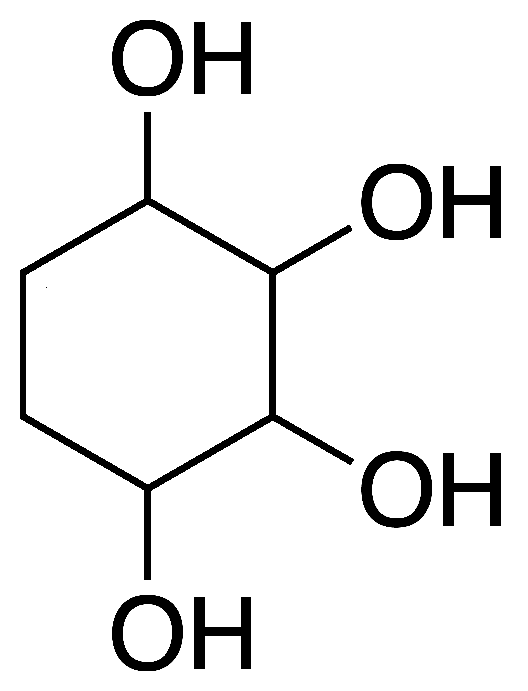
1,2,3,4
ortho

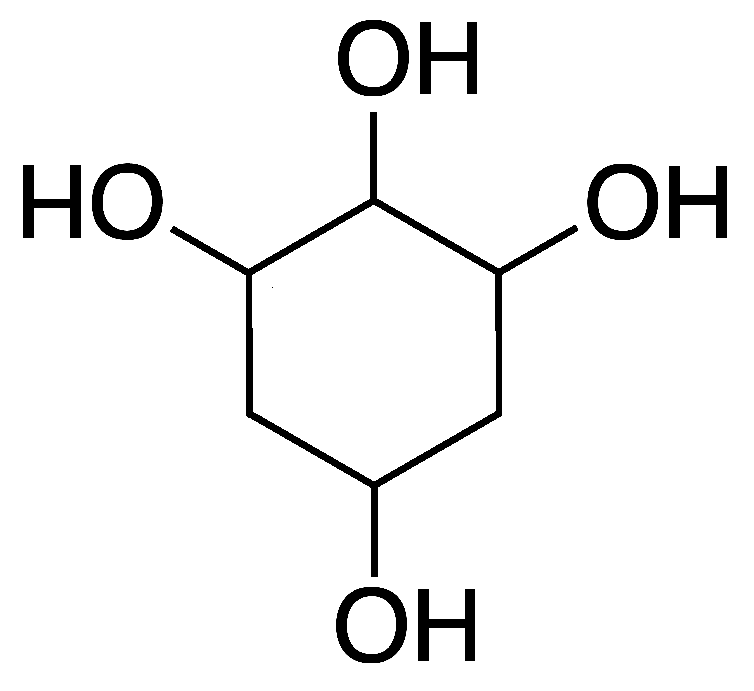
1,2,3,5
meta

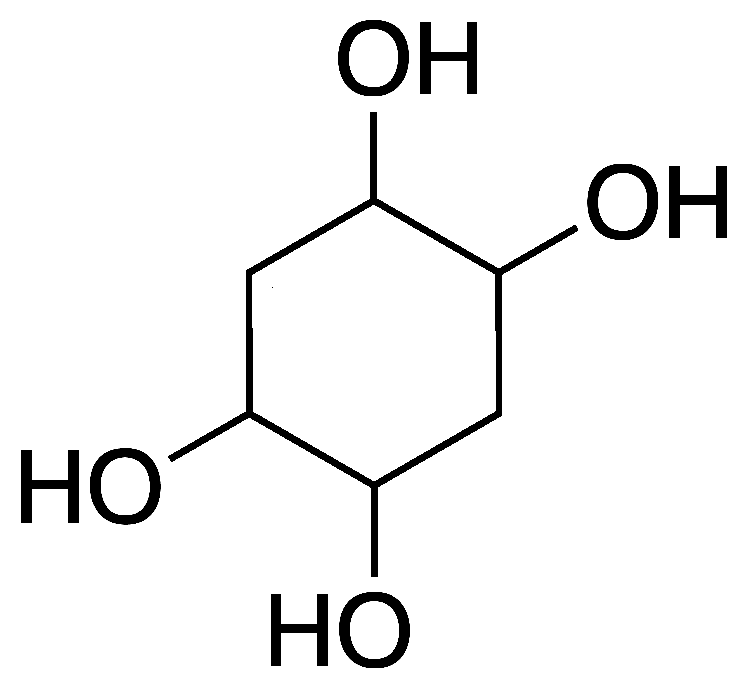
1,2,4,5
para

Possible isomers with two geminal hydroxyls (on the same carbon) are

- 1,1,2,3-Cyclohexanetetrol (4 isomers); hydrate of 2,3-dihydroxy-cyclohexanone
- 1,1,2,4-Cyclohexanetetrol (4 isomers); hydrate of 2,4-dihydroxy-cyclohexanone
- 1,1,3,4-Cyclohexanetetrol (4 isomers); hydrate of 3,4-dihydroxy-cyclohexanone

Possible isomers with two pairs of geminal hydroxyls:

- 1,1,2,2-Cyclohexanetetrol (1 isomer); twofold hydrate of 1,2-cyclohexanedione
- 1,1,3,3-Cyclohexanetetrol (1 isomer); twofold hydrate of 1,3-cyclohexanedione
- 1,1,4,4-Cyclohexanetetrol (1 isomer); twofold hydrate of 1,4-cyclohexanedione

== Preparation ==
The synthesis of cyclohexanetetrols can be achieved by, among other methods: reduction or hydrogenation of (1) cyclohexenetetrols, (2) tri-hydroxycyclohexanones, (3) pentahydroxycyclohexanones, (4) hydroxylated aromatic hydrocarbons, or (5) hydroxylated quinones; the (6) hydrogenolysis of dibromocyclohexanetetrols; the (7) hydration of diepoxycyclohexanes; and the hydroxylation of (8) cyclohexadienes or (9) cyclohexenediols.

== See also ==
- Calditol, cyclohex-5-ene-1,2,3,4-tetrol
- Inositol, 1,2,3,4,5,6-cyclohexanehexol
