= Cyclitol =

Class of chemical compounds

Inositol is a common cyclitol.

In organic chemistry, a cyclitol is a cycloalkane containing at least three hydroxyl, each attached to a different ring carbon atom. Most commonly, cyclitol refers to cyclic sugar alcohol. Cyclitols and their derivatives are some of the compatible solutes that are formed in a plant as a response to salt or water stress. Cyclitols are minor components of trees. Some cyclitols (e.g. quinic or shikimic acid) are parts of hydrolysable tannins.

Even simple cyclitols can be complicated by different isomeric possibilies. For example, there are three different constitutional isomers of cyclohexanetriol: 1,2,3-, 1,2,4-, and 1,3,5-. And even though there is only one reasonably stable constitutional isomer of cyclohexanehexol (inositol), there are nine stereoisomers possible.

== Naturally occurring cyclitols ==
=== Unsubstituted ===
- Conduritol, or cyclohex-5-ene-1,2,3,4-tetrol; two out of ten possible isomers.
- Inositol, or cyclohexane-1,2,3,4,5,6-hexol; four out of nine possible isomers.
- Cyclohexanetetrol

=== Substituted ===
- Bornesitol; (1R,2R,3S,4S,5R,6S)-6-methoxycyclohexane-1,2,3,4,5-pentol; D-(−)-O-methyl-myo-inositol
- Pinitol; (1S,2S,4S,5R)-6-methoxycyclohexane-1,2,3,4,5-pentol; 3-O-methyl-D-chiro-inositol
- Ononitol; (1R,2S,3S,4S,5S,6S)-6-methoxycyclohexane-1,2,3,4,5-pentaol; 4-O-methyl-myo-inositol
- Pinpollitol; (1R,2R,3R,4S,5R,6S)-3,6-dimethoxycyclohexane-1,2,4,5-tetraol; di-O-methyl-(+)-chiro-inositol
- Quebrachitol; (1R,2S,4S,5R)-6-methoxycyclohexane-1,2,3,4,5-pentol; 2-0-methyl-chiro-inositol
- Quinic acid; (1S,3R,4S,5R)-1,3,4,5-tetrahydroxycyclohexanecarboxylic acid
- Shikimic acid; (3R,4S,5R)-3,4,5-trihydroxycyclohex-1-ene-1-carboxylic acid
- Valienol; (1S,2S,3S,4R)-5-(Hydroxymethyl)cyclohex-5-ene-1,2,3,4-tetrol
- Viscumitol (1R,2S,3R,4S,5R,6S)-5,6-dimethoxycyclohexane-1,2,3,4-tetraol; 1,2-di-O-methyl-muco-inositol

=== Glycosides ===
- Ciceritol, a pinitol digalactoside

=== Phosphates ===
- Phytic acid; (1R,2S,3r,4R,5S,6s)-cyclohexane-1,2,3,4,5,6-hexayl hexakis[dihydrogen(phosphate)]; inositol hexakisphosphate

=== Other cyclitols ===
- 1,2,3,4-Cyclohexanetetrol
- 1,2,3,4,5-Cyclopentanepentol

== Applications ==
Aside from their utility to plants, cyclitols are useful as precursors to synthetic materials.

== Analysis methods ==
Théodore Posternak and others described the separation of cyclitols by paper chromatography using three methods of development: Tollens' reagents, the Meillère reagent (based on the Scherer-Gallois reaction), and digestion by Acetobacter suboxydans followed by Tollens' reagent.

== See also ==
- Aminocyclitol
