= 1,2,3,4,5-Cyclopentanepentol =

Names
- Preferred IUPAC name Cyclopentane-1,2,3,4,5-pentol
- Other names 1,2,3,4,5-Cyclopentanepentol; 1,2,3,4,5-Pentahydroxycyclopentane

Identifiers
CAS Number	56772-25-9; 1α,2α,3α,4α,5β: 18939-02-1
3D model (JSmol)	Interactive image
ChemSpider	480441
PubChem CID	552295
UNII	6LAW9E7VRD
CompTox Dashboard (EPA)	DTXSID501309632
- InChI: InChI=1S/C5H10O5/c6-1-2(7)4(9)5(10)3(1)8/h1-10H Key: XNAUSUVBDKISHM-UHFFFAOYSA-N
- SMILES: C1(C(C(C(C1O)O)O)O)O

Properties
Chemical formula	C_{5}H_{10}O_{5}
Molar mass	150.130 g·mol^{−1}
- Except where otherwise noted, data are given for materials in their standard state (at 25 °C [77 °F], 100 kPa). Infobox references

1,2,3,4,5-Cyclopentanepentol, also named cyclopentane-1,2,3,4,5-pentol or 1,2,3,4,5-pentahydroxycyclopentane is a chemical compound with formula C_{5}H_{10}O_{5} or (–CHOH–)_{5}, whose molecule consists of a ring of five carbon atoms (a cyclopentane skeleton), each connected to one hydrogen and one hydroxyl group. The unqualified term "cyclopentanepentol" usually refers to this compound. There are four distinct stereoisomers with this same structure.

The compound is a five-fold alcohol of cyclopentane, and technically a cyclic sugar alcohol (a cyclitol). However it is very rarely found in nature, and therefore it has received much less attention than the ubiquitous six-carbon version, inositol.

== Isomers ==
There are four distinct stereoisomers of cyclopentane-1,2,3,4,5-pentol, distinguished by the position of the hydroxyls relative to the mean plane of the ring. All have a plane of symmetry, and therefore are not chiral. One naming convention for the isomers labels each carbon number 1-5 with "α" for the side of the ring plane with most hydroxyls (three or more), and "β" for the other side. Another convention lists the hydroxyls on the majority side and then those on the minority side, with the two groups separated by a slash (and a "0" is written when the second list would be empty).

The four possible isomers are:

- 1α,2α,3α,4α,5α, 1,2,3,4,5/0, or all-cis (all hydroxyls on the same side). CAS 34322-89-9. Long needles, melting point 283 °C (darkens ar 220 °C). Obtained from cyclopentane-1α,2α-epoxi-3α,4α,5α-triol by treatment with hydrogen bromide to obtain cyclopentane-1β-bromo-2α,3α,4α,5α-tetrol, followed by benzoylation and treatment with DMSO and sodium bicarbonate.
- 1α,2α,3α,4α,5β or 1,2,3,4/5. CAS 18939-02-1. Soluble in hot ethanol. Melting point 220 °C or 209-210 °C. Obtained by solvolysis of two tetra-O-acetyl-O-tosyl-cyclopentanepentol, and also by hydroxylation of 3,4,5-trihydroxy-1-cyclopentenes.
- 1α,2α,3α,4β,5β or 1,2,3/4,5. CAS 18939-07-6. Soluble in ethanol. Melting point 168-169 °C, or 176 °C. Obtained by deamination of (1,4/2,3,5)-5-amino-1,3-di-O-acetyl-2,3-O-cyclohexylidene-1,2,3,4-cycopentanetetrol, and also by hydroxylation of 3,4,5-trihydroxy-1-cyclopentenes.
- 1α,2α,3β,4α,5β or 1,2,4/3,5. CAS 57784-52-8. Melting point 149.5-150.5 °C. Obtained from cyclopent-4-ene-1,3/2-triol by epoxidation and subsequent hydrolysis; also by acid hydrolysis of an anhydro-cyclopentanepentol, DL-1,2-anhydro-4,5-O-cyclohexylidene-1,2,3,4,5-cyclopentanepentol; and also from a D-xylo-pentodialdose.

The last three isomers interconvert by heating them at about 104 °C with 95% acetic acid in the presence of a strong acid. The conversion between 1,2,3,4/5 and 1,2,3/4,5 is faster and entails the hydrogen and hydroxyl switching places on either of the two carbon atoms located between an "α" and a "β" position. The formation of 1,2,4/3,5 is much slower and equilibrium is reached only after many days. The relative stabilities are 1,2,4/3,5 > 1,2,3/4,5 > 1,2,3,4/5, with equilibrium ratios 72 : 17.5 : 10.5.

The isomers can be identified qualitatively by their mobility in paper ionophoresis in a solution of calcium acetate and acetic acid, and revealed with a manganese sulfate/potassium permanganate reagent. The mobilities of the isomers, relative to that of cis-inositol, are 0.95 (12345/0), 0.44 (1234/5), 0.18 (123/45), and 0.04 (124/35). The variation is attributed to the formation of chelates with the calcium cations, with varying strengths depending on the number of hydroxyl pairs that can bind to the cation. Similar results can be obtained with lanthanum cations and thin-layer chromatography.

Mass spectrometry of the compound generates mainly the ion HO–CH=CH=CH=O^{+}H (mass-charge ratio 73) and a neutral radical C_{2}H_{5}O^{•}.

== Derivatives ==
Many esters are known, such as pentabenzoyls and pentaacetyls.

Trteatment of the derivative 3,4,5-tri-O-acetyl-1,2-O-ethylidene-(1,2,4/3,5)-cyclopentanepentol with triphenylcarbenium tetrafluoroborate [(C_{6}H_{5})_{3}C]^{+}[BF_{4}]^{−} to yield the cation 3,4,5-tri-O-acetyl-(1,2,4/3,5)-cyclopentanepentol-1,2-O-acetoxonium, which exhibits a peculiar 10-stage cyclic rearrangement.

Cyclopentanepentols form dihydrogenphosphate esters analogous to inositol's phytic acid esters.

The related compound 1,2,3,4,5-pentakis(hydroxymethyl)-cyclopentane (a colourless viscous oil, soluble in tert-butanol and DMSO) was synthesized in 1985 by L. M. Tolbert and others. It was hoped that dehydrative dimerization of this product would yield dodecahedrane.

== Natural occurrence ==
Organic compounds similar to (and possibly mimicking) glycoglycerolipids, with a 1,2,4/3,5-cyclopentanepentol group connected to the glycerol core in place of the sugar group, have been found in several genera of marine sponges with widely separate ranges.

Calditol is a substance found in the archaeobacteria of the order Sulfolobales. It is an ether that can be viewed as the condensation of glycerol and 3α-hydroxymethyl-1α,2α,3β,4α,5β-hydroxy cyclopentane, forming an ether bridge –O– between the 1-carbon of the former and the 4-carbon of the latter. Its seems to protects the cells in acidic environments.

Trace amounts of cyclopentanepentol were identified in some plants, such as the red flower calyces of Hibiscus sabdariffa (roselle); the plant Maclura pomifera (Osage orange); and the cyanobacterium Oscillatoria willei as well as in the products of its hydropyrolysis.

== History ==
The 1,2,4/3,5 isomer was briefly described in 1963 by H. Z. Sable and others. In 1968, Th. Posternak reported observation of 1,2,3,4/5 and 1,2,3/4,5, without the synthesis method. Better synthesis methods for these three were published by S. J. Angyal and B. M. Luttrell in 1970. Alternative methods for 1,2,3,4/5 and 1,2,3/4,5 were published in the same year by G. Wolczunowicz and others. The remaining all-cis isomer (1,2,3,4,5/0) was synthesized in 1971 by F. G. Cocu and Posternak.

== See also ==
- Cyclopentanepentone
- Decahydroxycyclopentane
