= 1,2,3,4-Cyclohexanetetrol =

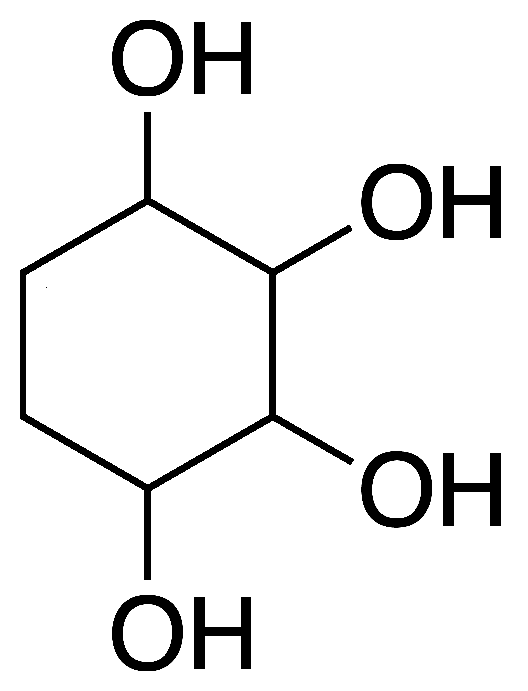
- Generic structure of 1,2,3,4-cyclohexenetetrol.

Names
- Preferred IUPAC name Cyclohexane-1,2,3,4-tetrol
- Other names Cyclohexaneerythritol

Identifiers
| CAS Number | 18424-68-5 |
| 3D model (JSmol) | Interactive image |
| ChemSpider | 245241 |
| PubChem CID | 278584 |
| CompTox Dashboard (EPA) | DTXSID80939809 |
- InChI: InChI=1S/C6H12O4/c7-3-1-2-4(8)6(10)5(3)9/h3-10H,1-2H2 Key: WESBWDZFWNIVRV-UHFFFAOYSA-N
- SMILES: C1CC(C(C(C1O)O)O)O
- Except where otherwise noted, data are given for materials in their standard state (at 25 °C [77 °F], 100 kPa). Infobox references

1,2,3,4-Cyclohexanetetrol (also named cyclohexane-1,2,3,4-tetrol, 1,2,3,4-tetrahydroxycyclohexane, or ortho-cyclohexanetetrol) is an organic compound whose molecule can be described as a cyclohexane with four hydroxyl (OH) groups substituted for hydrogen atoms on four consecutive carbon atoms. Its formula can be written C_{6}H_{12}O_{4}, C_{6}H_{8}(OH)_{4}, or (–CH(OH)–)_{4}(–CH_{2}–)_{2}.

There are 10 isomers with this same structural formula, which are among the 43 isomers of cyclohexanetetrol. They are all polyols, more specifically tetrols and cyclitols. Some of them have biologically important roles in some organisms.

== Isomers and nomenclature ==
There are 10 different isomers of this compound, that differ in the orientation of the four hydroxyls relative to the mean plane of the ring. They can be denoted by the letter "α" or "β" after each carbon index ("2α","2β","4β", etc.), to indicate the corresponding side of the plane relative to the 1-hydroxyl; or by listing all the "α" indices, then a slash "/", then the "β" indices (or "0" if the second list is empty).

Two of the isomers are achiral and thus meso compounds, with the remaining eight isomers forming four pairs of enantiomers. The possible isomers are:

- 1α,2α,3α,4α-, 1,2,3,4/0-, or all-cis, with all hydroxyls on the same side (achiral).
- 1α,2α,3α,4β- or 1,2,3/4-, and its enantiomer.
- 1α,2α,3β,4α- or 1,2,4/3-, and its enantiomer.
- 1α,2α,3β,4β- or 1,2/3,4-, and its enantiomer.
- 1α,2β,3α,4β- or 1,3/2,4-, and its enantiomer.
- 1α,2β,3β,4α- or 1,4/2,3- (achiral); dihydro-conduritol.

== History ==
Synthesis of 1,2,3,4-cyclohexanetretrols was first reported in 1933 by Pierre Bedos and Adrien Ruyer, by hydrolysis of 1,2;3,4-diepoxy-cyclohexane. They separated the reaction products into two isomers, with melting points 210C (tetrabenzoate: 146C) and 187C (tetrabenzoate: 260C), respectively, in 1:2 ratio.

In 1953, Théodore Posternak and H. Friedli obtained the achiral 1,4/2,3 isomer and racemic mixtures of the 1,2/3,4, 1,3/2,4, and 1,2,4/3 isomers. By biochemical oxydation, they removed the D- enantiomers of the last three, leaving the L- enantiomers.

Posternak and Reymond observed in 1953 that the 1,3/2,4 isomer (D and L forms) is not attacked by a certain strain of A. suboxydans, whereas all the others were metabolized with consumption of 1 atom of oxygen (possibly by formation of a ketone-triol), except the 1,2/3,4 isomer (D and L) that consumed 2 atoms.

In 1955, Posternak and Reymond studied the oxydation of the 1,4/2,3 isomer (dihydro-conduritol) by Acetobacter suboxydans, producing a trihydroxyketone. They also characterized the chiral isomers 1,3/2,4, 1,2,3/4, and 1,2,4/3.

== Synthesis ==
Methods which have been employed for the preparation of 1,2,3,4-cyclohexanetetrols include: reduction or hydrogenation of (1) cyclohexenetetrols, (2) tri-hydroxycyclohexanones, (3) pentahydroxycyclohexanones (inososes), (4) hydroxylated aromatics, or (5) hydroxylated quinones; the (6) hydrogenolysis of dibromocyclohexanetetrols; the (7) hydration of diepoxycyclohexanes; and the hydroxylation of (8) cyclohexadienes or (9) cyclohexenediols.

In 2007, Peter Valente and others described the preparation of achiral 1,4/2,3-cyclohexanetetrol (toxocarol) from 2,3-dioxabicyclo[2.2.2]oct-5-ene, a cyclohexene with a peroxide bridge (–O–O–) replacing hydrogens in carbons 3 and 6. The previous route was reduction of the peroxide brige to yield 3α,6α-dihydroxy cyclohexene, followed by di-hydoxylation of the double bond; which yielded a mixture of the 1,4/2,3 and 1,2,3,4/0 isomers. The authors found that, by reversing the order of the two steps, they could obtain 1,4/2,3 in 80% yield.
