= Vitamin B8 =

Vitamin B_{8} is a former designation given to several distinct chemical compounds, which are not considered true vitamins:

- Adenosine monophosphate (AMP), or 5'-adylenic acid
- Inositol
