= Ciceritol =

Names
- IUPAC name (1S,2R,3S,4R,5S,6S)-4-Methoxy-6-(((2R,3S,4S,5S,6R)-3,4,5-trihydroxy-6-((((2S,3R,4S,5S,6R)-3,4,5-trihydroxy-6-(hydroxymethyl)tetrahydro-2H-pyran-2-yl)oxy)methyl)tetrahydro-2H-pyran-2-yl)oxy)cyclohexane-1,2,3,5-tetraol
- Other names α-D-galactpyranosyl-(1→6)-α-D-galactopyranosyl-(1→2)-4-O-methyl-chiro-inositol

Identifiers
CAS Number	88167-26-4
3D model (JSmol)	Interactive image
ChemSpider	25779784
PubChem CID	10142653
CompTox Dashboard (EPA)	DTXSID60658006
- InChI: InChI=1S/C19H34O16/c1-31-16-11(26)10(25)12(27)17(15(16)30)35-19-14(29)9(24)7(22)5(34-19)3-32-18-13(28)8(23)6(21)4(2-20)33-18/h4-30H,2-3H2,1H3/t4-,5-,6-,7-,8+,9+,10-,11+,12+,13-,14+,15+,16-,17+,18+,19-/m1/s1 Key: ATDWJHOSZLOQDJ-MPNOHQOZSA-N
- SMILES: COC1C(C(C(C(C1O)OC2C(C(C(C(O2)COC3C(C(C(C(O3)CO)O)O)O)O)O)O)O)O)O

Properties
Chemical formula	C_{19}H_{34}O_{16}
Molar mass	518.465 g·mol^{−1}
- Except where otherwise noted, data are given for materials in their standard state (at 25 °C [77 °F], 100 kPa). verify (what is ?) Infobox references

Ciceritol is a cyclitol. It is a pinitol digalactoside that can be isolated from seeds of chickpea, lentil and white lupin.
