= Deoxy sugar =

Subtype of carbohydrates

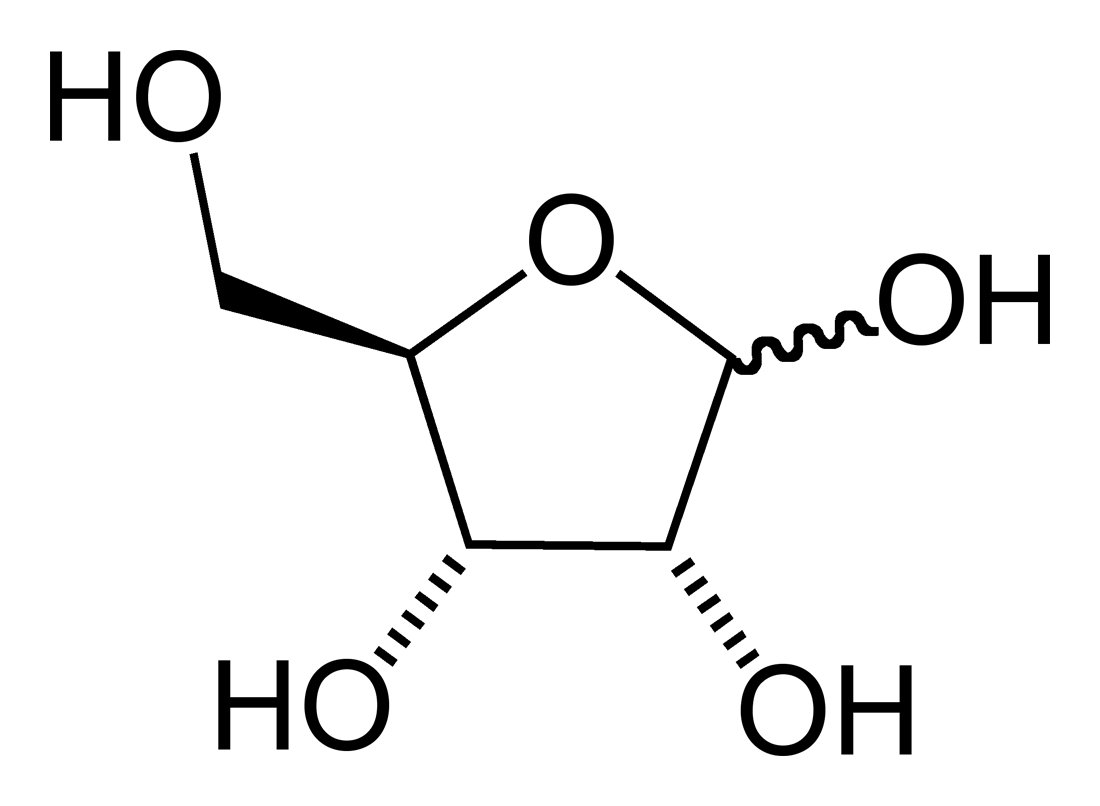

Comparison of the chemical
structures of ribose (top)
and deoxyribose (bottom).

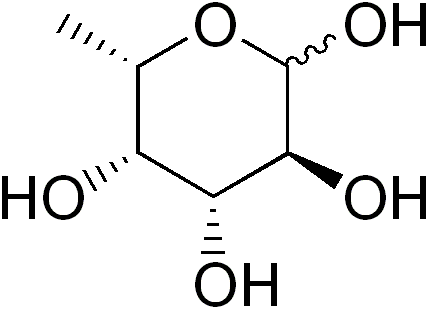
fucose

Deoxy sugars are sugars that have had a hydroxyl group replaced with a hydrogen atom.

Examples include:

- Deoxyribose, or 2-deoxy-D-ribose, a constituent of DNA
- Fucose, or 6-deoxy-L-galactose, main component of fucoidan of brown algae, and present in N-linked glycans
- Fuculose, or 6-deoxy-L-tagatose, one of the important components of avian influenza virus particles
- Rhamnose, or 6-deoxy-L-mannose, present in plant glycosides

In Escherichia coli bacteria, deoxyribose sugars are synthesized via two different pathways - one pathway involves aldol condensation, whereas the other pathway is conversion of a ribose sugar into a deoxyribose sugar by means of changes on the nucleotide or nucleoside level. Deoxyribose is synthesized through the reduction of ribose. Deoxyribose is derived from the same precursor as ribose being that the reduction of the sugar with the extra hydroxyl group results in the deoxy-sugar, which has its hydroxyl group replaced with a hydrogen atom.

== Dideoxy sugars ==
Some biologically important dideoxy sugars, sugars that have had two hydroxyl groups replaced with hydrogen atoms, include colitose, abequose, tyvelose, and paratose. These may be found in bacterial lipopolysaccharides

Colitose
(3,6-Dideoxy-L-xylo-hexose)

Abequose
(3,6-Dideoxy-D-xylo-hexose)

== See also ==
- Deoxynucleotide
