= Muco-Inositol =

muco-Inositol

Names
- IUPAC name muco-Inositol
- Systematic IUPAC name (1R,2r,3S,4R,5r,6S)-Cyclohexane-1,2,3,4,5,6-hexol

Identifiers
CAS Number	488-55-1
3D model (JSmol)	Interactive image
ChEBI	CHEBI:27987
ChemSpider	16736990
ECHA InfoCard	100.006.983
IUPHAR/BPS	4648
UNII	R1Y9F3N15A
- InChI: InChI=1S/C6H12O6/c7-1-2(8)4(10)6(12)5(11)3(1)9/h1-12H/t1-,2-,3-,4+,5+,6+ Key: CDAISMWEOUEBRE-GNIYUCBRSA-N
- SMILES: O[C@H]1[C@H](O)[C@@H](O)[C@@H](O)[C@H](O)[C@H]1O

Properties
Chemical formula	C_{6}H_{12}O_{6}
Molar mass	180.156 g·mol^{−1}
- Except where otherwise noted, data are given for materials in their standard state (at 25 °C [77 °F], 100 kPa). verify (what is ?) Infobox references

Muco-inositol is one of nine stereo-isomers of inositol. It is involved in Na-path sensory transduction, and a derivative is viscumitol.

The standardized numbering for atoms in the various inositol isomers has changed significantly since the 1950s. Only literature subsequent to 1988 adopts the modern convention, which is based on phosphorylation patterns in biological systems. In particular, the #1 atom is typically bound with a phosphoester in the hydrated sodium receptor.

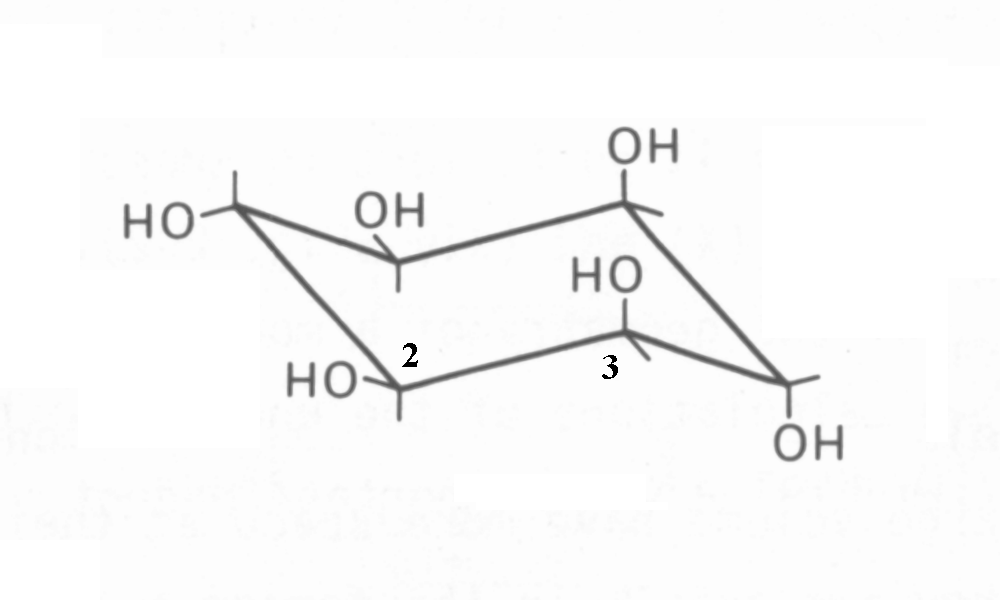
Muco-inositol, drawn in the chair conformation. Note the diaxial or axial-trans-hydroxyl pairs at atoms (3,4) and (4,5)

== See also ==
- D-chiro-Inositol
- L-chiro-Inositol
- allo-Inositol
- cis-Inositol
- epi-Inositol
- Generic form of the phosphorylated inositol
- neo-Inositol
- scyllo-Inositol
- Parent page, Inositol
