= Charles Joseph Tanret =

French pharmacist and chemist

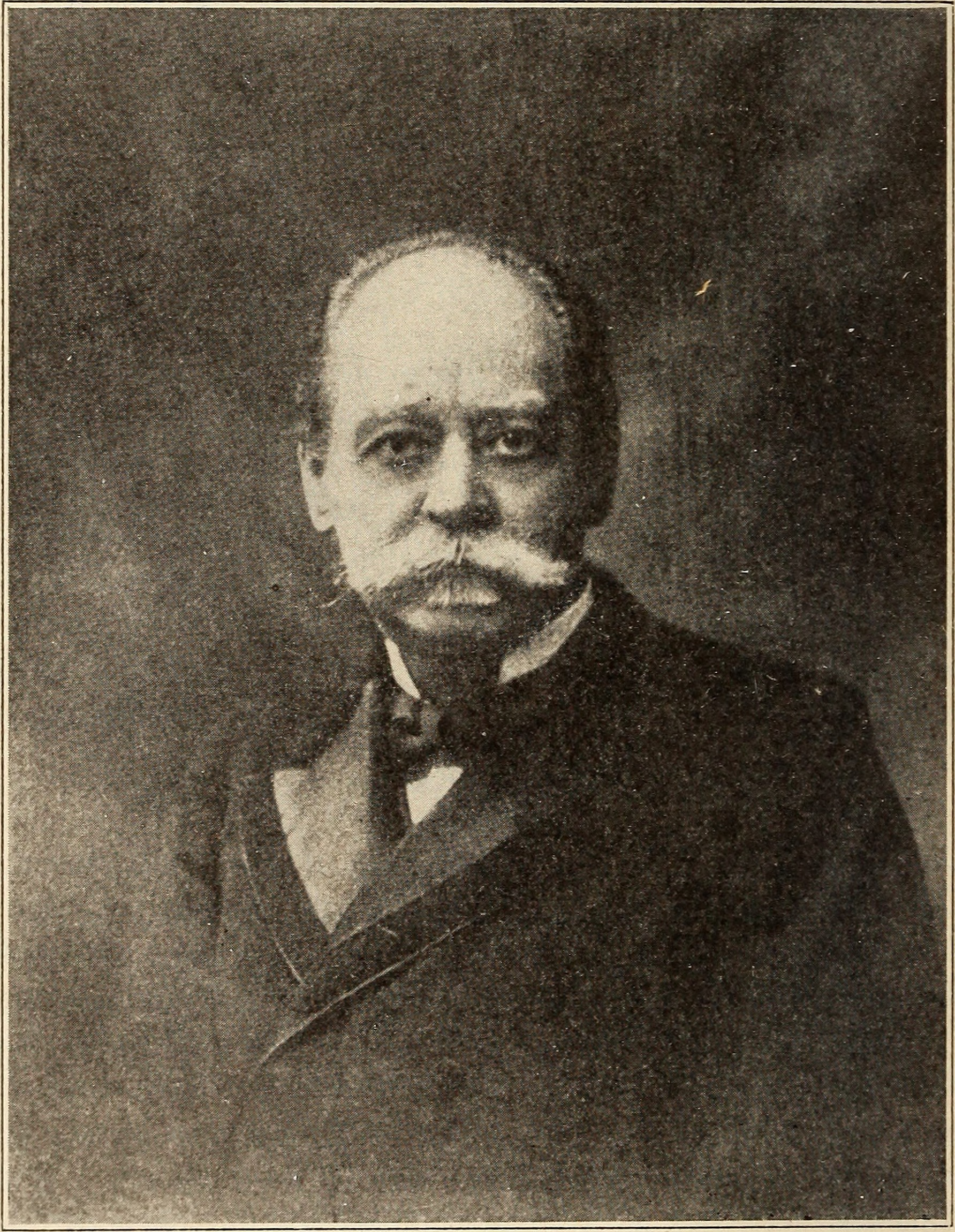
Portrait of Tanret

Charles Joseph Tanret (9 August 1847 in Joinville, France – 10 July 1917 in Paris) was a French pharmacist and chemist.

He notably studied the chemistry of sugars, reporting his observations of the mutarotation of glucose in 1895. He also identified quebrachitol in 1887 from the bark of Aspidosperma quebracho.

His son Georges was also a pharmacist, specialist of plant chemistry. Georges Tanret identified an alkaloid (galegine) from Galega officinalis that was evaluated in clinical trials in patients with diabetes in the 1920s and 1930s.
