= 1,2,4,5-Cyclohexanetetrol =

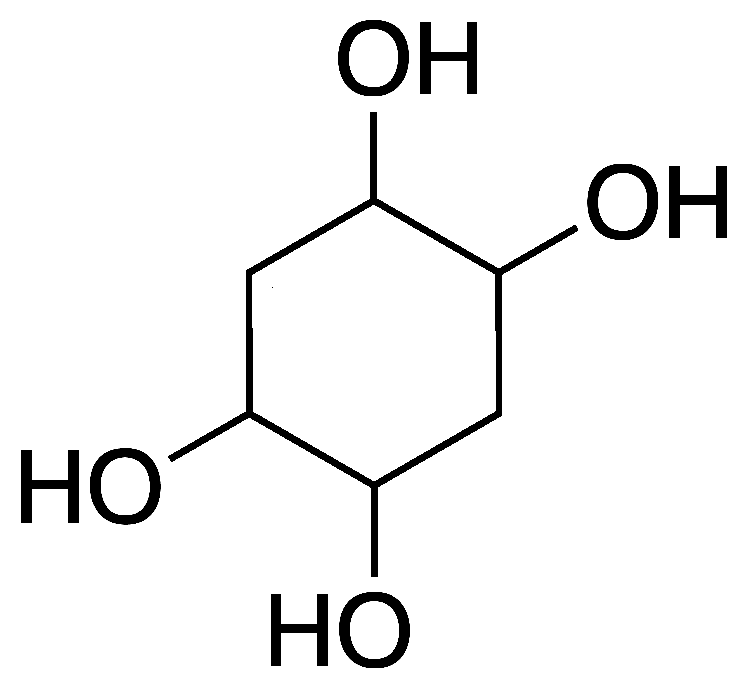
- Generic structure of 1,2,4,5-cyclohexanetetrol

Names
- Preferred IUPAC name Cyclohexane-1,2,4,5-tetrol
- Other names 1,2,4,5-Tetrahydroxycyclohexane

Identifiers
CAS Number	35652-37-0
3D model (JSmol)	Interactive image
ChemSpider	475253
PubChem CID	546000
CompTox Dashboard (EPA)	DTXSID501312132
- InChI: InChI=1S/C6H12O4/c7-3-1-4(8)6(10)2-5(3)9/h3-10H,1-2H2 Key: RDIDGZFQASQXBU-UHFFFAOYSA-N
- SMILES: C1C(C(CC(C1O)O)O)O

Properties
Chemical formula	C_{6}H_{12}O_{4}
Molar mass	148.158 g·mol^{−1}
Density	1.6±0.1 g/cm3
Melting point	91.3 °C (196.3 °F; 364.4 K) estimated
Boiling point	297.1±40.0 estimated
Solubility in water	very highly soluble in water

Hazards
Flash point	149.8±21.9 °C
- Except where otherwise noted, data are given for materials in their standard state (at 25 °C [77 °F], 100 kPa). Infobox references

1,2,4,5-Cyclohexanetetrol (also named cyclohexane-1,2,4,5-tetrol, 1,2,4,5-tetrahydroxycyclohexane, or para-cyclohexanetetrol) is an organic compound whose molecule can be described as a cyclohexane with four hydroxyl (OH) groups substituted for hydrogen atoms on two non-adjacent pairs of adjacent carbon atoms. Its formula can be written C_{6}H_{12}O_{4}, C_{6}H_{8}(OH)_{4}, or [–(CH(OH)–)_{2}–CH_{2}–]_{2}.

There are 7 isomers with this same structural formula, which are among the 43 isomers of cyclohexanetetrol. They are all polyols, more specifically tetrols and cyclitols. Some of them have biologically important roles in some organisms.

== Isomers and nomenclature ==
There are 7 different isomers of this compound, that differ in the orientation of the four hydroxyls relative to the mean plane of the ring. They can be denoted by the letter "α" or "β" after each carbon index ("2α","2β","4β", etc.), to indicate the corresponding side of the plane relative to the 1-hydroxyl; or by listing all the "α" indices, then a slash "/", then the "β" indices (or "0" if the second list is empty).

Three of the isomers are achiral and thus meso compounds, with the remaining four isomers forming two pairs of enantiomers. The possible isomers are:

- 1α,2α,4α,5α-, 1,2,4,5/0-, or all-cis, with all hydroxyls on the same side (achiral).
- 1α,2α,4α,5β- or 1,2,4/5-, and its enantiomer.
- 1α,2α,4β,5β- or 1,2/4,5- (achiral).
- 1α,2β,4β,5α- or 1,4/2,5- (achiral).
- 1α,2β,4α,5β- or 1,2/4,5-, and its enantiomer.

== Synthesis ==
Methods which have been employed for the preparation of 1,2,4,5-cyclohexanetetrols include: reduction or hydrogenation of (1) tri-hydroxycyclohexanones, (2) hydroxylated aromatics, or (3) hydroxylated quinones; the (4) hydrogenolysis of dibromocyclohexanetetrols; the (5) hydration of diepoxycyclohexanes; and the hydroxylation of (6) cyclohexadienes or (7) cyclohexenediols.

In 1998, Ahmet Maras and others reported the synthesis of racemic 1,4/2,5-cyclohexanetetrol (the chiral trans-trans para isomer) by hydroxyla-tion of 1,4-cyclohexadiene with stoichiometric amount of hydrogen peroxide (H_{2}O_{2}, 30% in 1-butanol), with selenium dioxide as catalyzer. The yield was 88%, with no trace of the 1,5/2,4 isomer. The racemic 1,4/2,5 isomer is soluble in ethanol, and yields colorless crystals with melting point 194–196 °C. The (+) enantiomer is betitol, a natural product first identified in sugar beets. The pure 1α,2α,4α,5α enantiomer crystallize as a monohydrate in the monoclinic C2 group (a = 10.675 Å, b = 7.3502 Å, c = 5.1968 Å, β = 103.877°)
