= Pinpollitol =

Names
- IUPAC name 1D-1,4-Di-O-methyl-chiro-inositol
- Systematic IUPAC name (1R,2R,3R,4S,5R,6S)-3,6-Dimethoxycyclohexane-1,2,4,5-tetrol
- Other names 1,4-Di-O-Methyl-D-chiro-inositol

Identifiers
CAS Number	56246-31-2
3D model (JSmol)	Interactive image
ChemSpider	24764944
PubChem CID	7099087
UNII	F7PXL3JSY5
CompTox Dashboard (EPA)	DTXSID10427769
- InChI: InChI=1S/C8H16O6/c1-13-7-3(9)5(11)8(14-2)6(12)4(7)10/h3-12H,1-2H3/t3-,4-,5-,6+,7-,8+/m1/s1 Key: DYQWYDODKPTUPA-CUYQCCFGSA-N; InChI=1/C8H16O6/c1-13-7-3(9)5(11)8(14-2)6(12)4(7)10/h3-12H,1-2H3/t3-,4-,5-,6+,7-,8+/m1/s1
- SMILES: CO[C@@H]1[C@@H]([C@H]([C@@H]([C@H]([C@H]1O)O)OC)O)O

Properties
Chemical formula	C_{8}H_{16}O_{6}
Molar mass	208.210 g·mol^{−1}
- Except where otherwise noted, data are given for materials in their standard state (at 25 °C [77 °F], 100 kPa). verify (what is ?) Infobox references

Pinpollitol is a cyclitol. It is a di-O-methyl-(+)-chiro-inositol that can be isolated from Pinus radiata.
