= Valienol =

- Stereo, skeletal formula of valienol

Names
- Preferred IUPAC name (1S,2S,3S,4R)-5-(Hydroxymethyl)cyclohex-5-ene-1,2,3,4-tetrol
- Other names Streptol

Identifiers
CAS Number	111136-25-5
3D model (JSmol)	Interactive image
ChEMBL	ChEMBL1233349
ChemSpider	4450703
DrugBank	DB03092
PubChem CID	5288564
UNII	J5344DZ89S
CompTox Dashboard (EPA)	DTXSID50415342
- InChI: InChI=1S/C7H12O5/c8-2-3-1-4(9)6(11)7(12)5(3)10/h1,4-12H,2H2/t4-,5+,6-,7-/m0/s1 Key: PJPGMULJEYSZBS-VZFHVOOUSA-N; InChI=1/C7H12O5/c8-2-3-1-4(9)6(11)7(12)5(3)10/h1,4-12H,2H2/t4-,5+,6-,7-/m0/s1 Key: PJPGMULJEYSZBS-VZFHVOOUBW
- SMILES: O[C@H]1\C=C(/[C@@H](O)[C@H](O)[C@H]1O)CO

Properties
Chemical formula	C_{7}H_{12}O_{5}
Molar mass	176.168 g·mol^{−1}
log P	−3.167
Acidity (pK_{a})	13.391
Basicity (pK_{b})	0.606
- Except where otherwise noted, data are given for materials in their standard state (at 25 °C [77 °F], 100 kPa). verify (what is ?) Infobox references

Valienol (streptol) is a C-7 cyclitol similar in structure to valienamine.
