= Geminal diol =

Class of organic compounds

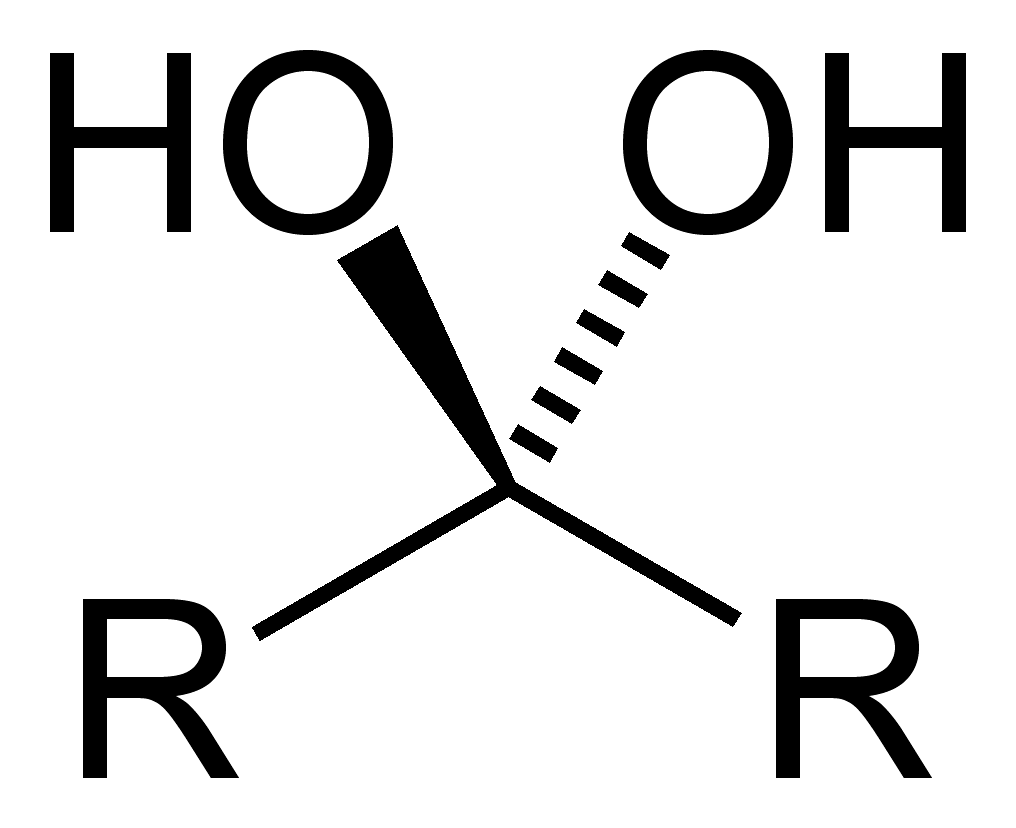
The generic geminal diol. The 'R's represent any groups other than OH.

A geminal diol (or gem-diol for short) is any organic compound having two hydroxyl functional groups (−OH) bound to the same carbon atom. Geminal diols are a subclass of the diols, which in turn are a special class of alcohols. Most of the geminal diols are considered unstable.

The simplest geminal diol is methanediol CH_{4}O_{2} or H_{2}C(OH)_{2}. Other examples are:

- Dihydroxymalonic acid (HOOC)_{2}C(OH)_{2}
- Decahydroxycyclopentane (C(OH)_{2})_{5}
- Chloral hydrate (Cl_{3}C)HC(OH)_{2}
- Saxitoxin C_{10}H_{15}N_{7}O_{2}(OH)_{2}

== Reactions ==
=== Hydration equilibrium ===
Geminal diols can be viewed as ketone (or aldehyde) hydrates. The two hydroxyl groups in a geminal diol are easily converted to a carbonyl or keto group C=O by loss of one water molecule. Conversely, a keto group can combine with water to form the geminal hydroxyl groups.

The equilibrium in water solution may be shifted towards either compound. For example, the equilibrium constant for the conversion of acetone (H_{3}C)_{2}C=O to propane-2,2-diol (H_{3}C)_{2}C(OH)_{2} is about 10^{−3}, while that of formaldehyde H_{2}C=O to methanediol H_{2}C(OH)_{2} is 10^{3}.

For conversion of hexafluoroacetone (F_{3}C)_{2}C=O to the diol (F_{3}C)_{2}C(OH)_{2}, the constant is about 10^{+6}, due to the electron withdrawing effect of the trifluoromethyl groups. Similarly, the conversion of chloral (Cl_{3}C)HC=O to chloral hydrate is strongly favored by influence of the trichloromethyl group.

In some cases, such as decahydroxycyclopentane and dodecahydroxycyclohexane, the geminal diol is stable while the corresponding ketone is not.

Geminal diols can also be viewed as extreme cases of hemiacetals, formed by reaction of carbonyl compounds with water, instead of with an alcohol.

== See also ==
- Hemiacetal
- Geminal
- Vicinal (chemistry)
