= Bornesitol =

- D-(−)-bornesitol

Names
- IUPAC name 1D-1-O-Methyl-myo-inositol
- Systematic IUPAC name (1R,2R,3S,4S,5R,6S)-6-Methoxycyclohexane-1,2,3,4,5-pentol

Identifiers
CAS Number	484-71-9
3D model (JSmol)	Interactive image
ChEBI	CHEBI:18427
ChemSpider	10254649
KEGG	C03659
PubChem CID	440078
UNII	RW8AP5YP8U
CompTox Dashboard (EPA)	DTXSID60331468
- InChI: InChI=1S/C7H14O6/c1-13-7-5(11)3(9)2(8)4(10)6(7)12/h2-12H,1H3/t2-,3-,4+,5-,6-,7-/m1/s1 Key: DSCFFEYYQKSRSV-AGZHHQKVSA-N
- SMILES: O[C@@H]1[C@@H](O)[C@@H](O)[C@@H](OC)[C@H](O)[C@H]1O

Properties
Chemical formula	C_{7}H_{14}O_{6}
Molar mass	194.183 g·mol^{−1}
Appearance	white solid
Melting point	198–201 °C (388–394 °F; 471–474 K)
- Except where otherwise noted, data are given for materials in their standard state (at 25 °C [77 °F], 100 kPa). Infobox references

Bornesitol is an organic compound with the formula C_{7}H_{14}O_{6}. Classified as a cyclitol (cyclic sugar alcohol), it is a methyl ether of D-myo-inositol.

It occurs in relative abundance in the leaves of Hancornia speciosa.

== Biosynthesis ==
Both enantiomers of bornesitol are known and are biosynthesised from inositol. Inositol 1-methyltransferase catalyses the reaction:

inositol
1-methylation
(–)-bornesitol

Inositol 3-methyltransferase catalyses the reaction to the mirror image molecule:

inositol
3-methylation
(+)-bornesitol
