= Dodecahydroxycyclohexane =

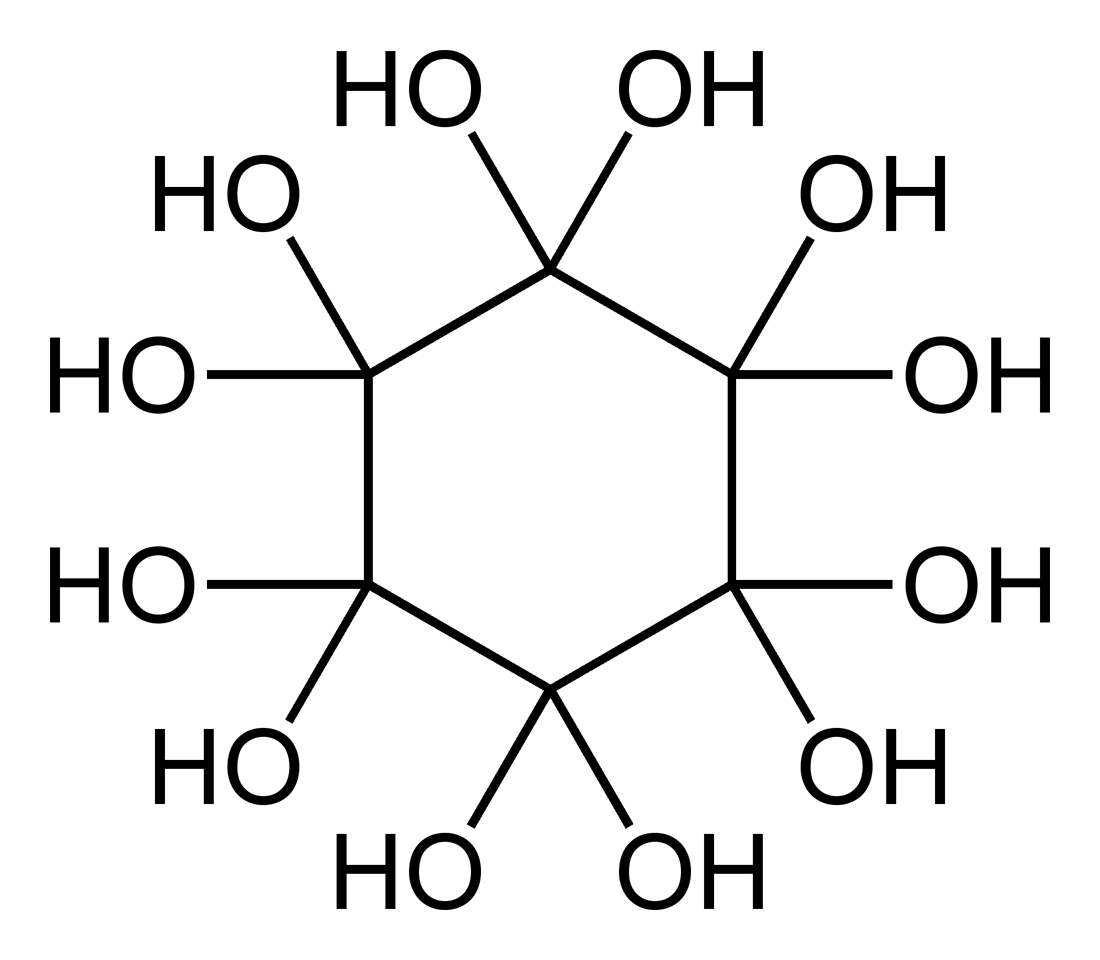

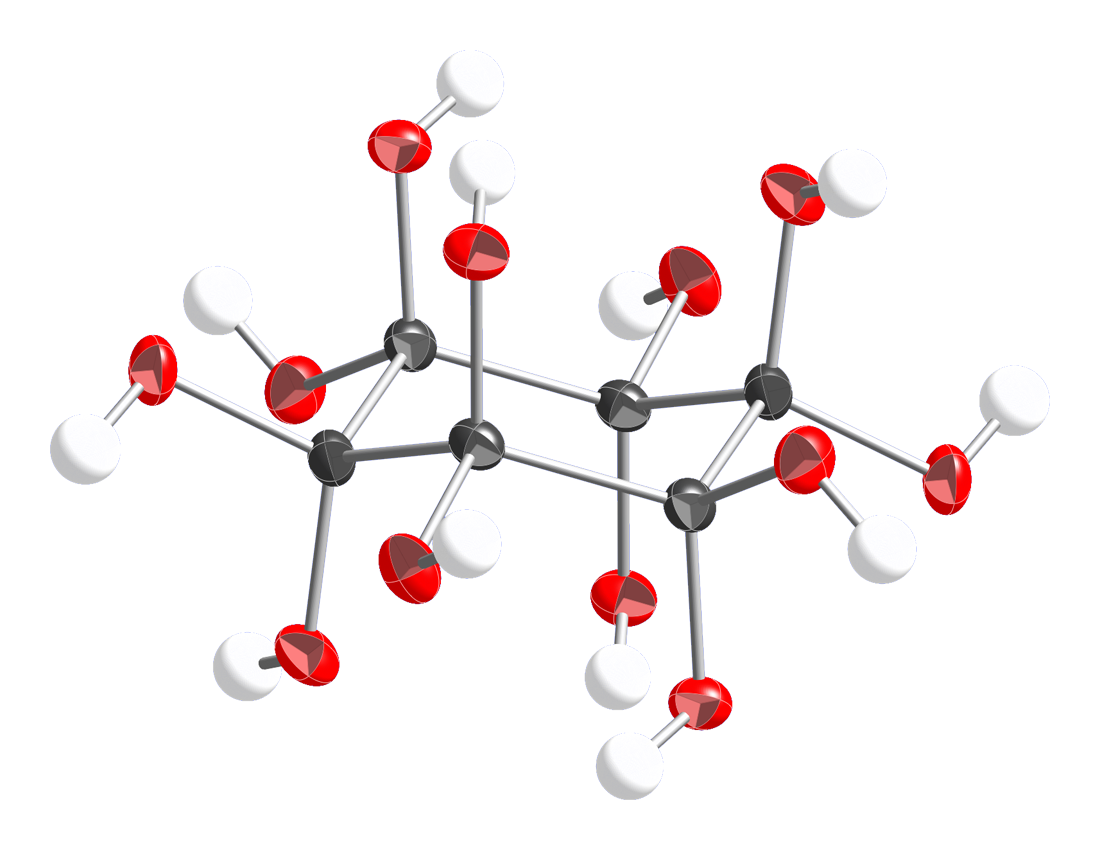

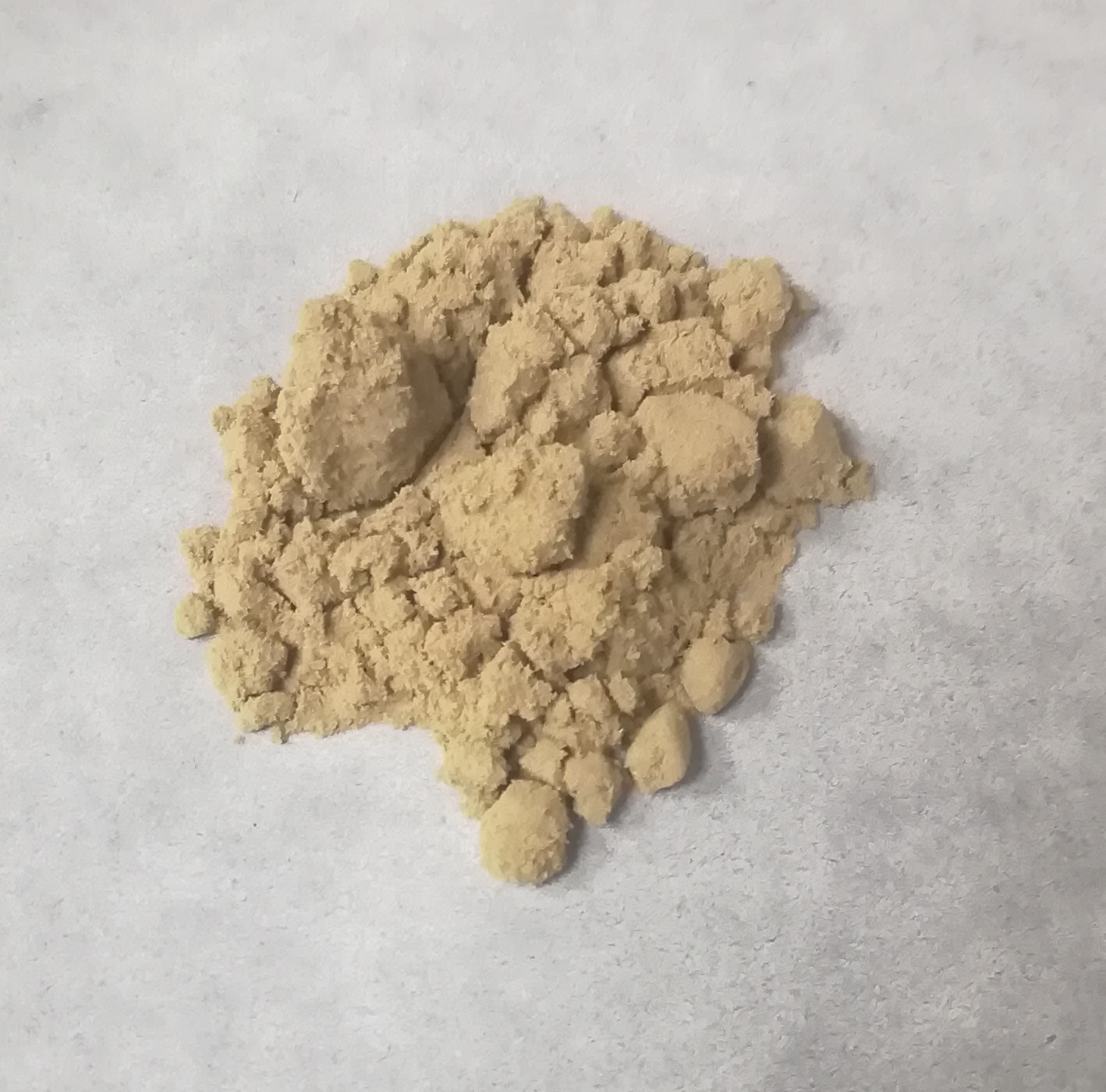

Names
- Preferred IUPAC name Cyclohexanedodecol
- Other names Dodecahydroxycyclohexane

Identifiers
CAS Number	54890-03-8; 13941-78-1 (dihydrate)
3D model (JSmol)	Interactive image
ChemSpider	279614
PubChem CID	315987
UNII	I1Z9VS3H64; 5BWD2J7B4W (dihydrate)
CompTox Dashboard (EPA)	DTXSID90203381
- InChI: InChI=1S/C6H12O12/c7-1(8)2(9,10)4(13,14)6(17,18)5(15,16)3(1,11)12/h7-18H Key: MZIPHGCOJCDHPI-UHFFFAOYSA-N; InChI=1/C6H12O12/c7-1(8)2(9,10)4(13,14)6(17,18)5(15,16)3(1,11)12/h7-18H Key: MZIPHGCOJCDHPI-UHFFFAOYAW
- SMILES: OC1(O)C(O)(O)C(O)(O)C(O)(O)C(O)(O)C1(O)O

Properties
Chemical formula	(C(OH)_{2})_{6}
Molar mass	276.150 g·mol^{−1}
Appearance	Colourless crystals (dihydrate)
- Except where otherwise noted, data are given for materials in their standard state (at 25 °C [77 °F], 100 kPa). verify (what is ?) Infobox references

Dodecahydroxycyclohexane is an organic compound with molecular formula C_{6}O_{12}H_{12} or C_{6}(OH)_{12} or (C(OH)_{2})_{6}. It is a sixfold geminal diol with a cyclohexane backbone and can be regarded as a sixfold hydrate of cyclohexanehexone (C_{6}O_{6}).

== Dihydrate ==
The dihydrate C_{6}O_{12}H_{12}·2H_{2}O can be crystallized from methanol as colorless plates or prisms, that decomposes at about 100 °C.

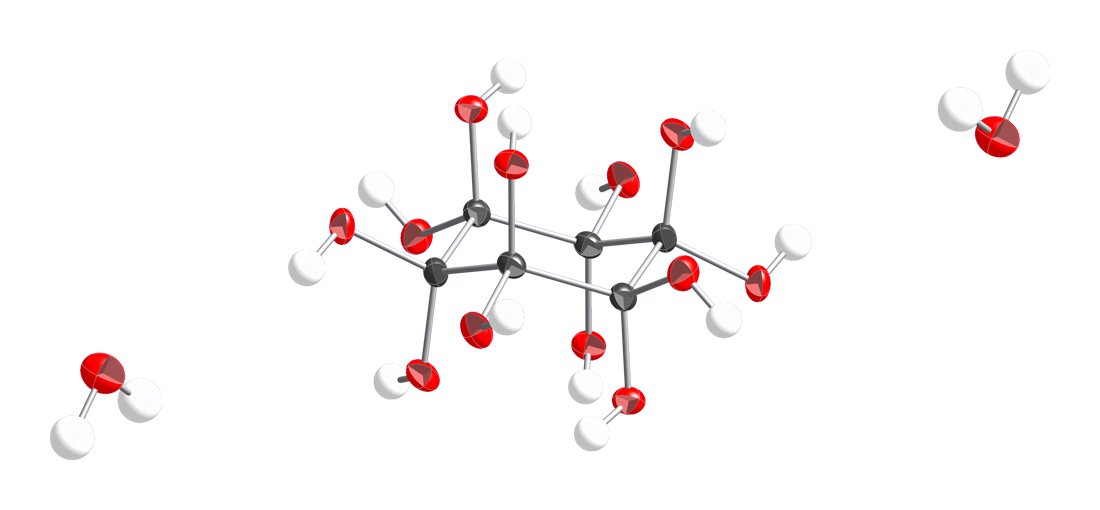
Thermal ellipsoid model of the molecular cell of dodecahydroxycyclohexane dihydrate

This compound was synthesized by Joseph Udo Lerch (1816–1892) in 1862 by oxidation of benzenehexol C_{6}(OH)_{6} or tetrahydroxy-p-benzoquinone C_{6}(OH)_{4}O_{2} and characterized by Rudolf Nietzki and Theodor Benckiser in 1885, although the product was for a long time assumed to be hexaketocyclohexane with water of crystallization (C_{6}O_{6}·8H_{2}O).

Indeed, this product is still commonly marketed as cyclohexanehexone octahydrate, hexaketocyclohexane octahydrate, triquinoyl octahydrate and similar names. Its true nature was suspected since the 1950s or earlier, but was confirmed by X-ray diffraction analysis only in 2005.

== See also ==
- Decahydroxycyclopentane
