= Dialdose =

Class of carbohydrates

In chemistry, a dialdose is a monosaccharide containing two aldehyde groups. For example, the hexodialdose O=CH–(CHOH)_{4}–CH=O, obtained by reducing glucuronic acid with sodium amalgam.
