= Colitose =

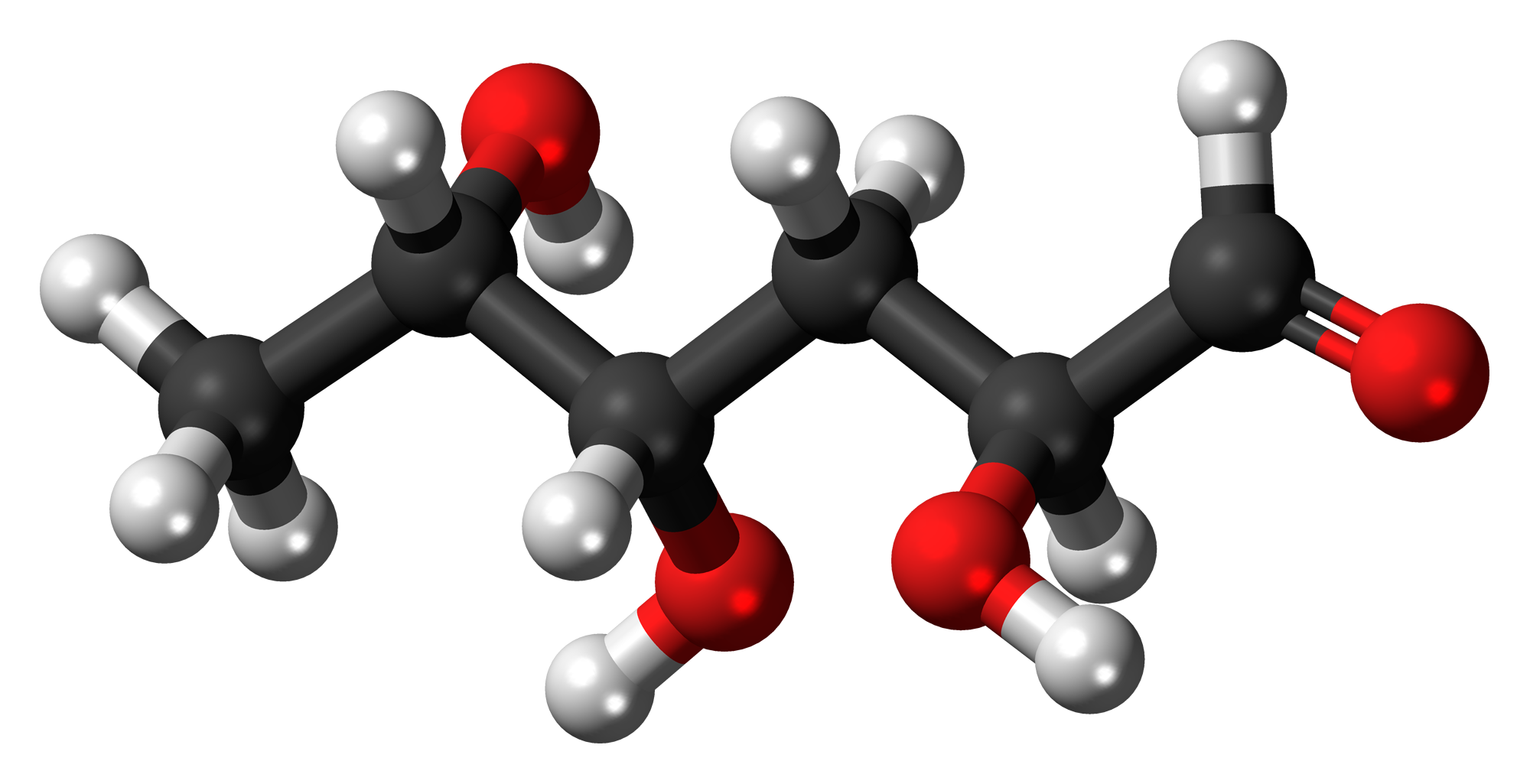

Names
- IUPAC name 3,6-Dideoxy-L-xylo-hexose
- Systematic IUPAC name (2S,4S,5S)-2,4,5-Trihydroxyhexanal

Identifiers
CAS Number	4221-05-0
3D model (JSmol)	Interactive image
ChemSpider	5256780
PubChem CID	6857442
CompTox Dashboard (EPA)	DTXSID80962374
- InChI: InChI=1S/C6H12O4/c1-4(8)6(10)2-5(9)3-7/h3-6,8-10H,2H2,1H3/t4-,5-,6-/m0/s1 Key: GNTQICZXQYZQNE-ZLUOBGJFSA-N; InChI=1/C6H12O4/c1-4(8)6(10)2-5(9)3-7/h3-6,8-10H,2H2,1H3/t4-,5-,6-/m0/s1 Key: GNTQICZXQYZQNE-ZLUOBGJFBL
- SMILES: O=C[C@@H](O)C[C@H](O)[C@@H](O)C

Properties
Chemical formula	C_{6}H_{12}O_{4}
Molar mass	148.158 g·mol^{−1}
Density	1.25 g/mL
- Except where otherwise noted, data are given for materials in their standard state (at 25 °C [77 °F], 100 kPa). verify (what is ?) Infobox references

Colitose is a mannose-derived 3,6-dideoxysugar produced by certain bacteria. It is a constituent of the lipopolysaccharide. It is the enantiomer of abequose.

== Biological role ==
Colitose is found in the O-antigen of certain Gram-negative bacteria such as Escherichia coli, Yersinia pseudotuberculosis, Salmonella enterica, Vibrio cholerae, and in marine bacteria such as Pseudoalteromonas sp. The sugar was first isolated in 1958, and subsequently was enzymatically synthesized in 1962.

== Biosynthesis ==
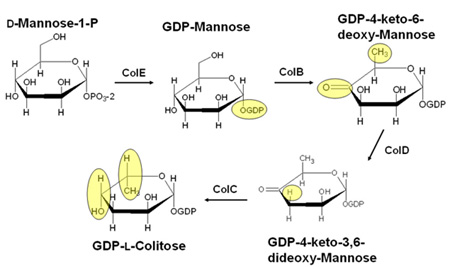
The GDP-L-colitose biosynthesis pathway. For clarity, groups modified by the previous enzymatic step are highlighted in yellow.

The biosynthesis of colitose begins with ColE, a mannose-1-phosphate guanylyltransferase that catalyzes the addition of a GMP moiety to mannose, yielding GDP-mannose. In the next step, ColB, an NADP-dependent short-chain dehydrogenase-reductase enzyme, catalyzes the oxidation at C-4 and the removal of the hydroxyl group at C-6. The resulting product, GDP-4-keto-6-deoxymannose, then reacts with the PLP-dependent enzyme GDP-4-keto-6-deoxymannose-3-dehydratase (ColD), which removes the hydroxyl at C-3 in a manner similar to that of serine dehydratase. In the final step, the product of ColD, GDP-4-keto-3,6-dideoxymannose, reacts with ColC, which reduces the ketone functionality at C-4 back to an alcohol and inverts the configuration about C-5.

The resulting product, GDP-L-colitose, is then incorporated into the O-antigen by glycosyltransferases and O-antigen processing proteins. Further reactions join the O-antigen to the core polysaccharide to form the full lipopolysaccharide.

=== GDP-4-keto-6-deoxymannose-3-dehydratase (ColD) ===
ColD is a PLP-dependent enzyme responsible for the removal of the C-3' hydroxyl group during the biosynthesis of GDP-colitose. It is a product of the Wbdk or ColD genes in Escherichia coli O55 or Salmonella enterica, respectively, and is commonly referred to as ColD.

== Usage in biotechnology ==
Although the sugar is relatively rare, recent work with glycosyltransferases suggests that obscure sugars such as colitose can be incorporated into existing natural-product scaffolds, thereby constructing novel and potentially therapeutic compounds.
