= Viscumitol =

Names
- IUPAC name 1,2-Di-O-methyl-muco-inositol
- Systematic IUPAC name (1R,2S,3R,4S,5R,6S)-5,6-Dimethoxycyclohexane-1,2,3,4-tetrol

Identifiers
CAS Number	145680-48-4
3D model (JSmol)	Interactive image
ChemSpider	24764943
PubChem CID	57459394
UNII	PU5UQL3NFY
CompTox Dashboard (EPA)	DTXSID70726664
- InChI: InChI=1S/C8H16O6/c1-13-7-5(11)3(9)4(10)6(12)8(7)14-2/h3-12H,1-2H3/t3-,4+,5+,6-,7-,8+ Key: HREVPIABJKTEDU-CNVXYERZSA-N; InChI=1S/C8H16O6/c1-13-7-5(11)3(9)4(10)6(12)8(7)14-2/h3-12H,1-2H3/t3-,4+,5+,6-,7-,8+
- SMILES: CO[C@@H]1[C@H]([C@@H]([C@@H]([C@H]([C@@H]1OC)O)O)O)O

Properties
Chemical formula	C_{8}H_{16}O_{6}
Molar mass	208.210 g·mol^{−1}
- Except where otherwise noted, data are given for materials in their standard state (at 25 °C [77 °F], 100 kPa). verify (what is ?) Infobox references

Viscumitol is a cyclitol. It is a dimethyl-ether of muco-inositol that can be isolated from Viscum album.
