= 2,3-Dihydroxy-3-methylpentanoic acid =

Names
- Preferred IUPAC name 2,3-Dihydroxy-3-methylpentanoic acid

Identifiers
CAS Number	562-43-6
3D model (JSmol)	Interactive image; Interactive image
ChemSpider	7
KEGG	C04104
MeSH	2,3-dihydroxy-3-methylpentanoic+acid
PubChem CID	8
UNII	PA5FGR93HJ
CompTox Dashboard (EPA)	DTXSID00971589
- InChI: InChI=1S/C6H12O4/c1-3-6(2,10)4(7)5(8)9/h4,7,10H,3H2,1-2H3,(H,8,9) Key: PDGXJDXVGMHUIR-UHFFFAOYSA-N; InChI=1/C6H12O4/c1-3-6(2,10)4(7)5(8)9/h4,7,10H,3H2,1-2H3,(H,8,9) Key: PDGXJDXVGMHUIR-UHFFFAOYAA
- SMILES: CCC(C)(C(C(=O)O)O)O; O=C(O)C(O)C(O)(C)CC

Properties
Chemical formula	C_{6}H_{12}O_{4}
Molar mass	148.16 g/mol
- Except where otherwise noted, data are given for materials in their standard state (at 25 °C [77 °F], 100 kPa). verify (what is ?) Infobox references

2,3-Dihydroxy-3-methylpentanoic acid is an intermediate in the metabolism of isoleucine.

== Metabolism ==
2,3-Dihydroxy-3-methylpentanoate is synthesized by the action of acetolactate mutase with subsequent reduction from α-aceto-α-hydroxybutyrate through 3-hydroxy-2-keto-3-methylpentanoate:

α-aceto-α-hydroxybutyrate → 3-hydroxy-2-keto-3-methylpentanoate

3-hydroxy-2-keto-3-methylpentanoate + NAD(P)H → 2,3-dihydroxy-3-methylpentanoate + NAD(P)^{+}

It is then processed by the action of dihydroxyacid dehydratase, which results in 2-keto-3-methylvalerate and water:

2,3-dihydroxy-3-methylpentanoate → 2-keto-3-methylvalerate + H_{2}O

Transamination of 2-keto-3-methylvalerate yields isoleucine.
