= Methyl-α-D-galactose =

Names
- IUPAC name Methyl α-D-galactopyranoside
- Systematic IUPAC name (2R,3R,4S,5R,6S)-2-(Hydroxymethyl)-6-methoxyoxane-3,4,5-triol

Identifiers
CAS Number	3396-99-4
3D model (JSmol)	Interactive image
ChemSpider	69385
ECHA InfoCard	100.020.229
PubChem CID	76935
UNII	ESJ6UY55QN
CompTox Dashboard (EPA)	DTXSID30187575
- InChI: InChI=1S/C7H14O6/c1-12-7-6(11)5(10)4(9)3(2-8)13-7/h3-11H,2H2,1H3/t3-,4+,5+,6-,7+/m1/s1 Key: HOVAGTYPODGVJG-PZRMXXKTSA-N; InChI=1/C7H14O6/c1-12-7-6(11)5(10)4(9)3(2-8)13-7/h3-11H,2H2,1H3/t3-,4+,5+,6-,7+/m1/s1 Key: HOVAGTYPODGVJG-PZRMXXKTBV
- SMILES: CO[C@@H]1[C@@H]([C@H]([C@H]([C@H](O1)CO)O)O)O

Properties
Chemical formula	C_{7}H_{14}O_{6}
Molar mass	194.183 g·mol^{−1}
Melting point	114-115 °C
- Except where otherwise noted, data are given for materials in their standard state (at 25 °C [77 °F], 100 kPa). Infobox references

Methyl-α-D-galactose is a constituent of Eleutherococcus senticosus.
