= Abequose =

Names
- IUPAC name 3,6-Dideoxy-D-xylo-hexose
- Systematic IUPAC name (2R,4R,5R)-2,4,5-Trihydroxyhexanal

Identifiers
| CAS Number | 56816-60-5; pyranose: 644-48-4 |
| 3D model (JSmol) | Interactive image; pyranose: Interactive image |
| ChEBI | CHEBI:27778 |
| ChemSpider | 4573722; pyranose: 141071 |
| DrugBank | DB02590 |
| KEGG | pyranose: C06471 |
| PubChem CID | 5460035; pyranose: 160540 |
| UNII | ZP07RTT4BN |
- InChI: InChI=1S/C6H12O4/c1-4(8)6(10)2-5(9)3-7/h3-6,8-10H,2H2,1H3/t4-,5-,6-/m1/s1 Key: GNTQICZXQYZQNE-HSUXUTPPSA-N; pyranose: InChI=1S/C6H12O4/c1-3-4(7)2-5(8)6(9)10-3/h3-9H,2H2,1H3/t3-,4-,5-,6?/m1/s1 Key: KYPWIZMAJMNPMJ-JDJSBBGDSA-N
- SMILES: C[C@H]([C@@H](C[C@H](C=O)O)O)O; pyranose: C[C@@H]1[C@@H](C[C@H](C(O1)O)O)O

Properties
| Chemical formula | C_{6}H_{12}O_{4} |
| Molar mass | 148.158 g·mol^{−1} |
- Except where otherwise noted, data are given for materials in their standard state (at 25 °C [77 °F], 100 kPa). Infobox references

Abequose is a hexose and a 3,6-dideoxysugar. It is a constituent of the in O-specific chains in lipopolysaccharides that occur in certain serotypes of Salmonella and Citrobacter bacteria. It is the enantiomer of colitose.
