= Quebrachitol =

Chemical compound

quebrachitol
- Chemical structure of L-quebrachitol

Names
- IUPAC name (1R,2S,4S,5R)-6-methoxycyclohexane-1,2,3,4,5-pentol
- Other names Quebrachitol; L-Quebrachitol (-)-Quebrachitol; 2-O-methyl-l-inositol; 2-0-methyl-chiro-inositol

Identifiers
CAS Number	642-38-6
3D model (JSmol)	Interactive image
ChEMBL	ChEMBL501109
ChemSpider	10254652
PubChem CID	151108
UNII	9W4JLQ7I4W
- InChI: InChI=1S/C7H14O6/c1-13-7-5(11)3(9)2(8)4(10)6(7)12/h2-12H,1H3/t2-,3-,4-,5+,6+,7-/m0/s1 Key: DSCFFEYYQKSRSV-FIZWYUIZSA-N
- SMILES: CO[C@H]1[C@@H]([C@H]([C@@H]([C@@H]([C@H]1O)O)O)O)O

Properties
Chemical formula	C_{7}H_{14}O_{6}
Molar mass	194.18 g/mol
Appearance	White to off-white powder
Melting point	190 to 198 °C (374 to 388 °F; 463 to 471 K)
Solubility in water	Soluble in DMSO, dimethyl formamide, or water
- Except where otherwise noted, data are given for materials in their standard state (at 25 °C [77 °F], 100 kPa). verify (what is ?) Infobox references

Quebrachitol is a naturally occurring optically active cyclitol, a cyclic polyol. It can be found in Allophylus edulis and in the serum left after the coagulation of the Hevea brasiliensis latex in the operation of rubber tapping. It is also found in Cannabis sativa, in Paullinia pinnata and in seabuckthorn.

It was first isolated by Tanret in 1887 from the bark of Aspidosperma quebracho. The substance was tested as a sweetening agent for diabetics in 1933. It shows a sweetening property half of that of sucrose but induces colic or diarrhoea at concentration used to render the food palatable.

Quebrachitol is a versatile building block in the construction of naturally occurring bioactive materials. For example, its conversion into antifungal (E)-β-methoxyacrylate, oudemansin X has been made.
