= Phosphatidylinositol phosphate =

Phosphatidylinositol phosphate may refer to:

- Phosphatidylinositol 3-phosphate, also known as PI(3)P
- Phosphatidylinositol 4-phosphate, also known as PI(4)P
- Phosphatidylinositol 5-phosphate, also known as PI(5)P
