= Ononitol =

Names
- IUPAC name 4-O-methyl-myo-inositol
- Systematic IUPAC name (1R,2S,3S,4S,5S,6S)-6-Methoxycyclohexane-1,2,3,4,5-pentol

Identifiers
CAS Number	6090-97-7
3D model (JSmol)	Interactive image
ChEBI	CHEBI:18266
ChemSpider	21864849
DrugBank	DB12969
KEGG	C06352
PubChem CID	164619
UNII	A998ME07KR
CompTox Dashboard (EPA)	DTXSID601029635
- InChI: InChI=1S/C7H14O6/c1-13-7-5(11)3(9)2(8)4(10)6(7)12/h2-12H,1H3/t2-,3-,4-,5+,6-,7-/m0/s1 Key: DSCFFEYYQKSRSV-GESKJZQWSA-N
- SMILES: CO[C@H]1[C@@H]([C@H]([C@@H]([C@@H]([C@@H]1O)O)O)O)O

Properties
Chemical formula	C_{7}H_{14}O_{6}
Molar mass	194.183 g·mol^{−1}
Appearance	colorless solid
Melting point	167–169 °C (333–336 °F; 440–442 K)
- Except where otherwise noted, data are given for materials in their standard state (at 25 °C [77 °F], 100 kPa). Infobox references

Ononitol is an organic compound with the formula (CHOH)_{5}(CHOCH_{3}). It is derivative of inositol, specifically 4-O-methyl-myo-inositol: an ether that can be described as the result of replacing the hydroxyl (–OH) in position 4 of myo-inositol by a methoxy group.

This compound occurs in several organisms. It is one of the predominant soluble carbohydrate derivatives in the root nodules of the pea plant created by the bacterium Rhizobium leguminosarum, and a constituent of Medicago sativa.

== Biosynthesis ==
The enzyme inositol 4-methyltransferase, which has been characterised from Mesembryanthemum crystallinum and Vigna umbellata, catalyses a methylation reaction in which inositol (myo-inositol) is converted to ononitol. The methyl group comes from the cofactor, S-adenosyl methionine (SAM).

inositol
+ SAM
ononitol
+ SAH
