= Decahydroxycyclopentane =

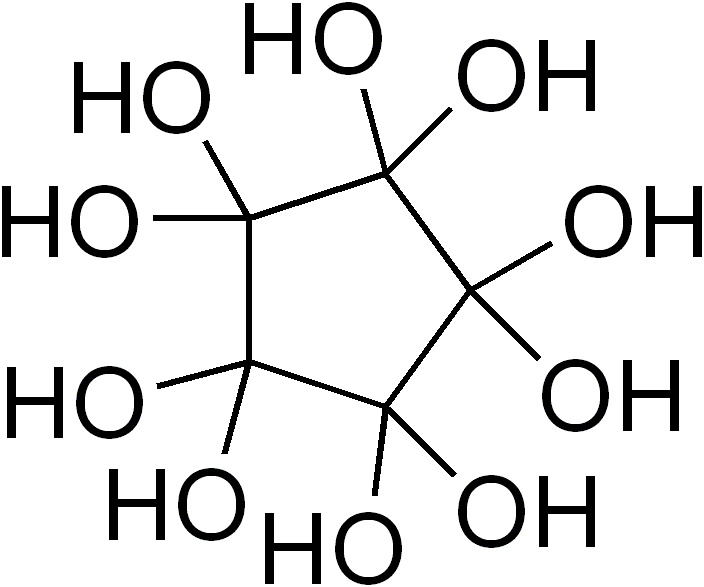

Names
- Preferred IUPAC name Cyclopentanedecol
- Other names Decahydroxycyclopentane

Identifiers
CAS Number	595-03-9
3D model (JSmol)	Interactive image; Interactive image
ChemSpider	21477367
PubChem CID	12305029
CompTox Dashboard (EPA)	DTXSID30486717
- InChI: InChI=1S/C5H10O10/c6-1(7)2(8,9)4(12,13)5(14,15)3(1,10)11/h6-15H Key: DYYJKUCFQJABMU-UHFFFAOYSA-N; InChI=1/C5H10O10/c6-1(7)2(8,9)4(12,13)5(14,15)3(1,10)11/h6-15H Key: DYYJKUCFQJABMU-UHFFFAOYAO
- SMILES: OC1(O)C(O)(O)C(O)(O)C(O)(O)C(O)1O; C1(C(C(C(C1(O)O)(O)O)(O)O)(O)O)(O)O

Properties
Chemical formula	C_{5}H_{10}O_{10}
Molar mass	230.125 g·mol^{−1}
Appearance	Colorless crystals
Melting point	115 °C (239 °F; 388 K) (with dehydration); slow decomposition at about 160 °C (320 °F; 433 K)
- Except where otherwise noted, data are given for materials in their standard state (at 25 °C [77 °F], 100 kPa). verify (what is ?) Infobox references

Decahydroxycyclopentane is an organic compound with formula C_{5}O_{10}H_{10} or C_{5}(OH)_{10}. It is a fivefold geminal diol on a cyclopentane backbone.

The compound can be regarded as the fivefold hydrate of cyclopentanepentone. Indeed, the product referred to in the literature and trade as "cyclopentanepentone pentahydrate" (C_{5}O_{5}·5H_{2}O) is now believed to be the decahydroxycyclopentane.

The compound was synthesized by Heinrich Will in 1861, although for a long time it was believed to be a hydrate of C_{5}O_{5}. It can be prepared by oxidation of croconic acid C_{5}O_{3}(OH)_{2} with nitric acid. It can be isolated as water-soluble colorless crystals that melt with dehydration at about 115 °C, and slowly decompose at about 160 °C.

== See also ==
- Dodecahydroxycyclohexane
