= Pinitol =

- Chemical structure of D-pinitol

Names
- IUPAC name 1D-chiro-Inositol
- Systematic IUPAC name (1R,2S,3R,4S,5S,6S)-6-Methoxycyclohexane-1,2,3,4,5-pentol
- Other names 3-O-Methyl-D-chiro-inositol; D-(+)-chiro-Inositol; D-Pinitol; Inzitol; D-(+)-Pinitol (+)-Pinitol; Sennitol; Pinnitol

Identifiers
CAS Number	10284-63-6
3D model (JSmol)	Interactive image
ChEBI	CHEBI:28548
ChEMBL	ChEMBL493737
ChemSpider	10369209
PubChem CID	164619 (3Ξ,6Ξ)
UNII	TF9HZN9T0M
CompTox Dashboard (EPA)	DTXSID50883108
- InChI: InChI=1S/C7H14O6/c1-13-7-5(11)3(9)2(8)4(10)6(7)12/h2-12H,1H3/t2-,3-,4-,5-,6+,7+/m0/s1 Key: DSCFFEYYQKSRSV-KLJZZCKASA-N
- SMILES: CO[C@@H]1[C@@H](O)[C@@H](O)[C@H](O)[C@H](O)[C@H]1O

Properties
Chemical formula	C_{7}H_{14}O_{6}
Molar mass	194.183 g·mol^{−1}
Melting point	179 to 185 °C (354 to 365 °F; 452 to 458 K)
- Except where otherwise noted, data are given for materials in their standard state (at 25 °C [77 °F], 100 kPa). verify (what is ?) Infobox references

Pinitol is a cyclitol, a cyclic polyol. It is a known anti-diabetic agent isolated from Sutherlandia frutescens leaves. Gall plant tannins can be differentiated by their content of pinitol. It was first identified in the sugar pine (Pinus lambertiana). It is also found in other plants, such as in the pods of the carob tree.

Certain variants of the bacteria Pseudomonas putida have been used in organic synthesis, the first example being the oxidation of benzene, employed by Steven Ley in the synthesis of (±)-pinitol.

== Glycosides ==
Ciceritol is a pinitol digalactoside that can be isolated from seeds of chickpea, lentil and white lupin.

A cyclitol derivative can be found in the marine sponge Petrosia sp.

== Biosynthesis ==
D-pinitol is the most widely distributed inositol ether in plants. In Angiosperms, D-pinitol has a relatively straight forward and short biosynthesis which proceeds via the Loewus pathway. The precursor to the biosynthesis pathway is glucose-6-phosphate, which is converted to D-ononitol (1-D-4-O-methyl-myo-inositol) via myo-inositol. Ononitol is epimerized to yield D-pinitol via a D-ononitol epimerase using NADPH as a cofactor.

Biosynthesis of D-Pinitol
