= 1D-chiro-Inositol =

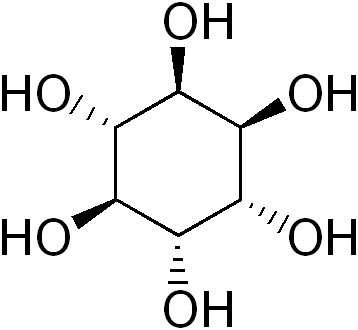
- D-chiro-Inositol

Names
- IUPAC name 1D-chiro-Inositol
- Systematic IUPAC name (1R,2R,3S,4S,5S,6S)-Cyclohexane-1,2,3,4,5,6-hexol
- Other names DCI cis-1,2,4-trans-3,5,6-Cyclohexanehexol; 1D-1,2,4/3,5,6-Cyclohexanehexol; 1,2,4/3,5,6-Hexahydroxycyclohexane (+)-inositol

Identifiers
CAS Number	643-12-9
3D model (JSmol)	Interactive image
ChEBI	CHEBI:27372
ChemSpider	10254647
ECHA InfoCard	100.010.359
IUPHAR/BPS	4645
UNII	6R79WV4R10
CompTox Dashboard (EPA)	DTXSID60903982
- InChI: InChI=1S/C6H12O6/c7-1-2(8)4(10)6(12)5(11)3(1)9/h1-12H/t1-,2-,3-,4-,5+,6+/m0/s1 Key: CDAISMWEOUEBRE-LKPKBOIGSA-N
- SMILES: O[C@H]1[C@@H](O)[C@H](O)[C@H](O)[C@@H](O)[C@@H]1O

Properties
Chemical formula	C_{6}H_{12}O_{6}
Molar mass	180.156 g·mol^{−1}
Melting point	230 °C (446 °F; 503 K)
Chiral rotation ([α]_{D})	[α]23/D +55°, c = 1.2 in H_{2}O
- Except where otherwise noted, data are given for materials in their standard state (at 25 °C [77 °F], 100 kPa). verify (what is ?) Infobox references

1D-chiro-Inositol or D-chiro-inositol (often abbreviated DCI) is a chemical substance with formula C_{6}H_{12}O_{6}, one of the nine isomers of cyclohexane-1,2,3,4,5,6-hexol (which may be collectively called "inositol"). The molecule has a ring of six carbon atoms, each bound to one hydrogen atom and one hydroxyl (OH) group. The hydroxyls on atoms 1, 2, and 4, in counterclockwise order, lie above the plane of the ring. The molecule being distinct from its mirror image, the compound is chiral, hence its name. Its enantiomer (mirror compound) is 1L-chiro-inositol.

Compared to its more common isomer myo-inositol, DCI seems to have relatively minor roles in biochemistry and medicine, mostly connected to the biochemistry of insulin and other hormones.

== Biochemistry and physiology ==
=== Occurrence ===
The common isomer myo-inositol is converted into DCI in the human body by an insulin dependent enzyme, NAD/NADH epimerase.

=== Insulin interactions ===
D-chiro-inositol is known to be an important secondary messenger in insulin signal transduction. It accelerates the dephosphorylation of glycogen synthase and pyruvate dehydrogenase, rate limiting enzymes of non-oxidative and oxidative glucose disposal. Exogenous DCI may act to bypass defective normal epimerization of myo-inositol to DCI associated with insulin resistance and at least partially restore insulin sensitivity and glucose disposal. In clinical practice, it improves insulin signaling, thus restoring physiological insulin levels in resistant subjects.

=== Hormonal treatment ===
D-chiro-inositol has been used to induce ovulation in women with polycystic ovary syndrome.

DCI depresses the expression of the steroidogenic enzyme aromatase, which is responsible for the conversion of androgens to estrogens. One pilot study found males taking DCI had increased androgens and reduced estrogen.
