= Conduritol =

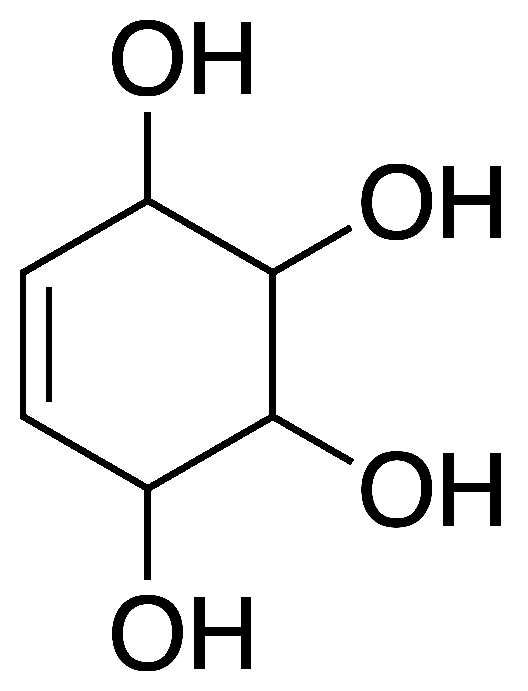

Names
- Preferred IUPAC name Cyclohex-5-ene-1,2,3,4-tetrol

Identifiers
CAS Number	526-87-4
3D model (JSmol)	Interactive image
ChEMBL	ChEMBL307042
ChemSpider	120119; 8466331 2R; 9063309 1R,2R,3R,4R; 8233179 1R,2R,3R,4S
PubChem CID	136345; 10290862 2R; 10888045 1R,2R,3R,4R; 10057625 1R,2R,3R,4S; 11008046 1R,2R,3S,4R; 11094760 1R,2R,3S,4S
UNII	QL4Q1FZ32P
CompTox Dashboard (EPA)	DTXSID90894915
- InChI: InChI=1S/C6H10O4/c7-3-1-2-4(8)6(10)5(3)9/h1-10H Key: LRUBQXAKGXQBHA-UHFFFAOYSA-N
- SMILES: OC1C=CC(O)C(O)C1O

Properties
Chemical formula	C_{6}H_{10}O_{4}
Molar mass	146.142 g·mol^{−1}
log P	−2.764
Acidity (pK_{a})	13.325
Basicity (pK_{b})	1.672
- Except where otherwise noted, data are given for materials in their standard state (at 25 °C [77 °F], 100 kPa). Infobox references

Conduritol or 1,2,3,4-cyclohexenetetrol is any of the organic compounds with chemical formula C_{6}H_{10}O_{4}, that can be seen as derivatives of cyclohexene with four hydroxyl groups (OH) replacing hydrogen atoms on the four carbon atoms not adjacent to the double bond. They are therefore cyclic polyols or cyclitols.

The compounds in this group exhibit cis–trans isomerism, with six isomers that differ by the relative positions of the hydroxyls compared to the mean plane of the ring. Of these isomers, the A and D isomers are meso compounds, while the remaining isomers can each exist as two distinct enantiomers.

Only the A and B isomers have been found in nature. The first conduritol was isolated in 1908 by K. Kübler from the bark of the vine Ruehssia cundurango subsp. cundurango (syn. Marsdenia cundurango), hence its name.

== See also ==
- Inositol
