= Inositol =

Carbocyclic sugar

myo-Inositol
- myo-Inositol

- myo-Inositol

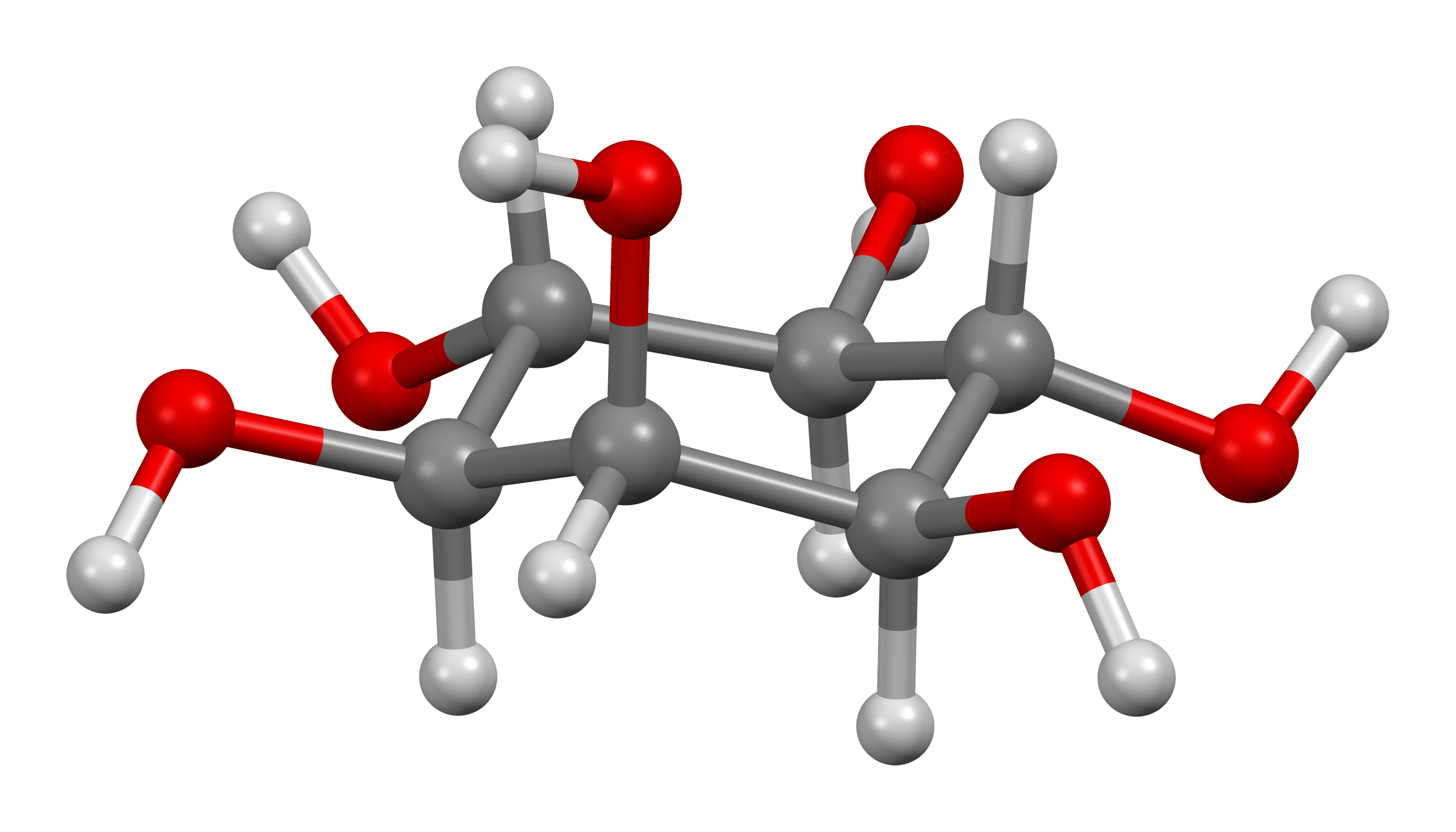

Names
- IUPAC name myo-Inositol
- Systematic IUPAC name (1R,2S,3r,4R,5S,6s)-Cyclohexane-1,2,3,4,5,6-hexol
- Other names cis-1,2,3,5-trans-4,6-Cyclohexanehexol; Cyclohexanehexol; Mouse antialopecia factor Nucite; Phaseomannite; Phaseomannitol; Rat antispectacled eye factor Scyllite (for the isomer scyllo-inositol); Vitamin B_{8}

Identifiers
CAS Number	87-89-8
3D model (JSmol)	Interactive image
ChEBI	CHEBI:17268
ChEMBL	ChEMBL1222251
ChemSpider	10239179
ECHA InfoCard	100.027.295
IUPHAR/BPS	4495
KEGG	D08079
PubChem CID	892
UNII	4L6452S749
CompTox Dashboard (EPA)	DTXSID30110000
- InChI: InChI=1S/C6H12O6/c7-1-2(8)4(10)6(12)5(11)3(1)9/h1-12H/t1-,2-,3-,4+,5-,6- Key: CDAISMWEOUEBRE-GPIVLXJGSA-N; InChI=1/C6H12O6/c7-1-2(8)4(10)6(12)5(11)3(1)9/h1-12H/t1-,2-,3-,4+,5-,6- Key: CDAISMWEOUEBRE-GPIVLXJGBG
- SMILES: O[C@@H]1[C@@H](O)[C@H](O)[C@H](O)[C@H](O)[C@H]1O

Properties
Chemical formula	C_{6}H_{12}O_{6}
Molar mass	180.16 g/mol
Density	1.752 g/cm^{3}
Melting point	225 to 227 °C (437 to 441 °F; 498 to 500 K)

Thermochemistry
Std enthalpy of formation (Δ_{f}H^{⦵}_{298})	−1329.3 kJ/mol
Std enthalpy of combustion (Δ_{c}H^{⦵}_{298})	−2747 kJ/mol

Pharmacology
ATC code	A11HA07 (WHO)

Hazards
- GHS labelling
Pictograms	(GHS07: Exclamation mark)
Signal word	Warning
Hazard statements	H315, H319, H335
Precautionary statements	P261, P264, P264+P265, P271, P280, P302+P352, P304+P340, P305+P351+P338, P319, P321, P332+P317, P337+P317, P362+P364, P403+P233, P405, P501
NFPA 704 (fire diamond)	1 0 0
Flash point	143 °C (289 °F; 416 K)
- Except where otherwise noted, data are given for materials in their standard state (at 25 °C [77 °F], 100 kPa). verify (what is ?) Infobox references

In biochemistry, medicine, and related sciences, inositol generally refers to myo-inositol (formerly meso-inositol), the most important stereoisomer of the chemical compound cyclohexane-1,2,3,4,5,6-hexol. Its formula is C_{6}H_{12}O_{6}; the molecule has a ring of six carbon atoms, each with a hydrogen atom and a hydroxy group (–OH). In myo-inositol, two of the hydroxyls, neither adjacent nor opposite, lie above the respective hydrogens relative to the mean plane of the ring.

The compound is a carbohydrate, specifically a sugar alcohol with half the sweetness of the disaccharide sucrose (table sugar). It is one of the most ancient components of living beings with multiple functions in eukaryotes, including structural lipids and secondary messengers. A human kidney makes about two grams per day from glucose, but other tissues synthesize it too. The highest concentration is in the brain, where it plays an important role in making other neurotransmitters and some steroid hormones bind to their receptors. In other tissues, it mediates cell signal transduction in response to a variety of hormones, neurotransmitters, and growth factors and participates in osmoregulation. In most mammalian cells the concentrations of myo-inositol are 5 to 500 times greater inside cells than outside them.

The other naturally occurring stereoisomers of cyclohexane-1,2,3,4,5,6-hexol are scyllo-, muco-, D-chiro-, L-chiro-, and neo-inositol, although they occur in minimal quantities compared to myo-inositol. The other possible isomers are allo-, epi-, and cis-inositol.

== History ==
myo-Inositol was first isolated from muscle extracts by Johanes Joseph Scherer (1814–1869) in 1850. It was formerly called meso-inositol to distinguish it from the chiro- isomers. However, since all other isomers are meso (non-chiral) compounds, the name myo-inositol is now preferred (myo- being a medical prefix for "muscle").

Inositol was once considered a member of the vitamin B complex, namely vitamin B_{8} before the discovery that it is made naturally in the human body, and therefore cannot be a vitamin or essential nutrient.

== Chemical properties ==
myo-Inositol is a meso compound, meaning it is optically inactive because it has a plane of symmetry. It is a white crystalline powder, relatively stable in the air. It is highly soluble in water, slightly soluble in glacial acetic acid, ethanol, glycol, and glycerin, but insoluble in chloroform and ether.

In its most stable conformation, the myo-inositol isomer assumes the chair conformation, which moves the maximum number of hydroxyls to the equatorial position, where they are farthest apart from each other. In this conformation, the natural myo isomer has a structure in which five of the six hydroxyls (the first, third, fourth, fifth, and sixth) are equatorial, whereas the second hydroxyl group is axial.

== Physiological roles ==
myo-Inositol plays an important role as the structural basis for a number of secondary messengers in eukaryotic cells, the various inositol phosphates. Glycosylated inositol phosphates (or inositol phosphate glycans, IPGs) are produced by cells exposed to insulin and mediate a range of its blood glucose-regulating outcomes. Inositol also serves as an important component of the structural lipids phosphatidylinositol (PI) and its various phosphates, the phosphatidylinositol phosphate (PIP) lipids.

Glycophosphatidylinositol (or GPI), a glycosylated derivative of phosphatidylinositol formed with the sugar nucleotide UDP-GalNAc and the fatty acids palmitate or myristate, provides the anchor to which many peripheral membrane proteins are attached to cell membranes, defining the category GPI-anchored proteins.

== Biosynthesis ==
In humans, myo-inositol is synthesized de novo but D-chiro-inositol is not. myo-Inositol is synthesized from glucose 6-phosphate (G6P) in two steps. First, G6P is isomerised by an inositol-3-phosphate synthase enzyme (for example, ISYNA1) to myo-inositol 1-phosphate, which is then dephosphorylated by an inositol monophosphatase enzyme (for example, IMPA1) to give free myo-inositol. In humans, most inositol is synthesized in the kidneys, followed by testicles, typically in amounts of a few grams per day.

At the peripheral level, myo-inositol is converted to D-chiro-inositol by a specific epimerase. Only a minor fraction of myo-inositol is converted into D-chiro-inositol. The activity of this epimerase is insulin dependent, causing a reduction of D-chiro-inositol in muscle, fat, and liver when there is insulin resistance. D-chiro-inositol reduces the conversion of testosterone to estrogen, thereby increases the levels of testosterone and worsening PMOS.

=== Phytic acid in plants ===
Inositolhexaphosphate, or phytic acid

Inositol hexaphosphate, also called phytic acid or IP6, is a phytochemical and the principal storage form of phosphorus in many plant tissues, especially bran and seed. Phosphorus and inositol in phytate form are not generally bioavailable to non-ruminant animals because these animals lack the digestive enzyme phytase required to remove the phosphate groups. Ruminants readily digest phytate because of the phytase produced by microorganisms in the rumen. Moreover, phytic acid also chelates important minerals such as calcium, magnesium, iron, and zinc, making them unabsorbable, and contributing to mineral deficiencies in people whose diets rely highly on bran and seeds for their mineral intake, such as occurs in developing countries. Because of this, phytic acid is considered as an antinutrient.

Inositol penta- (IP5), tetra- (IP4), and triphosphate (IP3) are also called "phytates".

Inositol or its phosphates and associated lipids are found in many foods, in particular fruit, especially cantaloupe and oranges. In plants, the hexaphosphate of inositol, phytic acid or its salts, the phytates, serve as phosphate stores in seed, for example in nuts and beans. Phytic acid also occurs in cereals with high bran content. Phytate is, however, not directly bioavailable to humans in the diet, since it is not digestible. Some food preparation techniques partly break down phytates to change this. However, inositol in the form of phospholipids, as found in certain plant-derived substances such as lecithins, is well absorbed and relatively bioavailable.

== Biological function ==
Inositol, phosphatidylinositol, and some of their mono- and polyphosphates function as secondary messengers in a number of intracellular signal transduction pathways. They are involved in a number of biological processes, including:

- Insulin signal transduction
- Cytoskeleton assembly
- Nerve guidance (epsin)
- Intracellular calcium (Ca^{2+}) concentration control
- Cell membrane potential maintenance
- Breakdown of fats
- Gene expression

In one important family of pathways, phosphatidylinositol 4,5-bisphosphate (PIP_{2}) is stored in cellular membranes until it is released by any of a number of signalling proteins and transformed into various secondary messengers, for example diacylglycerol and inositol trisphosphate.

myo-Inositol has very low toxicity, with a reported LD_{50} of 10000 mg/kg relative to body weight (oral) in rats.

== Industrial uses ==
=== Explosives industry ===
At the 1936 meeting of the American Chemical Society, professor Edward Bartow of the University of Iowa presented a commercially viable means of extracting large amounts of inositol from the phytic acid naturally present in waste corn. As a possible use for the chemical, he suggested 'inositol nitrate' as a more stable alternative to nitroglycerin. Today, inositol nitrate is used to gelatinize nitrocellulose in many modern explosives and solid rocket propellants.

=== Road salt ===
When plants are exposed to increasing concentrations of road salt, the plant cells become dysfunctional and undergo apoptosis, leading to inhibited growth. Inositol pretreatment could reduce these effects.

== Research and clinical applications ==
=== Trichotillomania ===
High doses of inositol have been explored for treatment of trichotillomania (compulsive hair-pulling) and related disorders, but no definitive evidence points to its effectiveness.

=== Polyendocrine metabolic ovarian syndrome ===
Inositol is considered a safe and effective treatment for polyendocrine metabolic ovarian syndrome (PMOS), formerly referred to as polycystic ovary syndrome (PCOS). The following clinical outcomes of myo-inositol therapy for patients with PMOS have been observed:

- increasing insulin sensitivity
- reducing hyperandrogenism
- reducing the risk of metabolic disease
- restoring follicle-stimulating hormone (FSH) to luteinizing hormone (LH) ratio and menstrual cycle regularization
- increasing the chance of success in patients seeking reproductive therapy

Combination therapy with myo-inositol (MI) and D-chiro-inositol (DCI) has also been extensively clinically explored, with the balance of each stereroisomer in circulation gaining popularity as a clinical target. Insulin stimulates the irreversible conversion of MI to DCI by an NADPH-dependent epimerase, and both hyperinsulinemia and elevated DCI are clinically evident in 70% of PMOS patients. The plasmatic ratio of MI and DCI in healthy subjects is 40:1 MI to DCI respectively, and using this ratio as a clinical target shows the same efficacy of MI alone but in a shorter time. In addition, the physiological ratio maintains healthy oocyte quality in patients using DCI for fertility therapy, whereas DCI monotherapy is known to impair oocyte quality.

Disturbances in intracellular MI and DCI ratios are linked to an "inositol resistance" phenotype, where MI monotherapy is less effective. MI and α-lactalbumin combination therapy increases myo-inositol plasmatic content in inositol-resistant patients with a relative improvement of hormonal and metabolic parameters.

=== Other pathology ===
Inositol supplementation has been shown to significantly decrease triglycerides and LDL cholesterol in patients with metabolic diseases.

myo-Inositol is important for thyroid hormone synthesis. Depletion of myo-inositol may predispose to development of hypothyroidism. Patients with hypothyroidism have a higher demand for myo-inositol than healthy subjects.

Inositol should not be routinely implemented for the management of preterm babies who have or are at a risk of infant respiratory distress syndrome (RDS).

myo-Inositol helps prevent neural tube defects with particular efficacy in combination with folic acid.

== Use as a cutting agent ==
Inositol has been used as an adulterant or cutting agent for many illegal drugs, such as cocaine, methamphetamine, and sometimes heroin, probably because of its solubility, powdery texture, or reduced sweetness (50%) compared to more common sugars.

Inositol is also used as a stand-in film prop for cocaine in filmmaking.

== Nutritional sources ==
myo-Inositol is naturally present in a variety of foods, although tables of food composition do not always distinguish between lecithin, the relatively bioavailable lipid form and the biounavailable phytate/phosphate form. Foods containing the highest concentrations of myo-inositol and its compounds include fruits, beans, grains, and nuts. Fruits in particular, especially oranges and cantaloupe, contain the highest amounts of myo-inositol. It is also present in beans, nuts, and grains, however, these contain large amounts of myo-inositol in the phytate form, which is not bioavailable without transformation by phytase enzymes. Bacillus subtilis, the microorganism which produces the fermented food natto, produces phytase enzymes that may convert phytic acid to a more bioavailable form of inositol polyphosphate in the gut. Additionally, Bacteroides species in the gut secrete vesicles containing an active enzyme which converts the phytate molecule into bioavailable phosphorus and inositol polyphosphate, which is an important signaling molecule in the human body.

myo-Inositol can also be found as an ingredient in energy drinks, either in conjunction with or as a substitute for glucose.

In humans, myo-inositol is naturally made from glucose-6-phosphate through enzymatic dephosphorylation.

== Production ==
As of 2021, the main industrial process for the production of myo-inositol (mostly in China and Japan) started with phytate (IP6) extracted from the soaking water resulting from corn and rice bran processing. After purification, the phytate is hydrolysed, and myo-inositol is separated by crystallization.

Another route is microbial fermentation of carbohydrates by various organisms, such as the fungus Neurospora crassa (Beadle and Tatum, 1945), Candida boidini (Shirai et al., 1997), Saccharomyces cerevisiae (Culbertson et al., 1976), Escherichia coli (Hansen, 1999). Alternatively, enzyme extracts from microbial cultures can be used in vitro to obtain myo-inositol from various substrates, including glucose, sucrose, starch, xylose, and amylose.
