= Stackebrandtia endophytica =

Scientific classification
- Domain: Bacteria
- Kingdom: Bacillati
- Phylum: Actinomycetota
- Class: Actinomycetes
- Order: Glycomycetales
- Family: Glycomycetaceae
- Genus: Stackebrandtia
- Species: S. endophytica

Binomial name
- Stackebrandtia endophytica Xiong et al. 2015

Type strain
- BCRC 16954; DSM 45928; YIM 64602

Species of bacteria

Stackebrandtia endophytica is an endophytic bacterium from the genus of Stackebrandtia which has been isolated from the stem of the plant Tripterygium wilfordii from Yunnan in China.
