= Stackebrandtia cavernae =

Scientific classification
- Domain: Bacteria
- Kingdom: Bacillati
- Phylum: Actinomycetota
- Class: Actinomycetes
- Order: Glycomycetales
- Family: Glycomycetaceae
- Genus: Stackebrandtia
- Species: S. cavernae

Binomial name
- Stackebrandtia cavernae Zhang et al. 2016

Type strain
- CCTCC AA 2015021; DSM 100594; KCTC 39599; YIM ART06

Species of bacteria

Stackebrandtia cavernae is a bacterium from the genus of Stackebrandtia which has been isolated from a rock from a karst cave in China.
