= Glycomyces dulcitolivorans =

Scientific classification
- Domain: Bacteria
- Kingdom: Bacillati
- Phylum: Actinomycetota
- Class: Actinomycetia
- Order: Glycomycetales
- Family: Glycomycetaceae
- Genus: Glycomyces
- Species: G. dulcitolivorans

Binomial name
- Glycomyces dulcitolivorans Mu et al. 2018

Type strain
- CGMCC 4.7414; DSM 105121; SJ-25

Species of bacteria

Glycomyces dulcitolivorans is a bacterium from the genus of Glycomyces which has been isolated from rhizospheric soil from the plant Triticum aestivum.
