= Glycomyces anabasis =

Scientific classification
- Domain: Bacteria
- Kingdom: Bacillati
- Phylum: Actinomycetota
- Class: Actinomycetia
- Order: Glycomycetales
- Family: Glycomycetaceae
- Genus: Glycomyces
- Species: G. anabasis

Binomial name
- Glycomyces anabasis Zhang et al. 2018

Type strain
- EGI 6500139; JCM 30088; KCTC 29495

Species of bacteria

Glycomyces anabasis is an endophytic bacterium from the genus of Glycomyces which has been isolated from the roots of the plant Anabasis aphylla from Xinjiang in China.
