= Glycomyces halotolerans =

Scientific classification
- Domain: Bacteria
- Kingdom: Bacillati
- Phylum: Actinomycetota
- Class: Actinomycetia
- Order: Glycomycetales
- Family: Glycomycetaceae
- Genus: Glycomyces
- Species: G. halotolerans

Binomial name
- Glycomyces halotolerans Guan et al. 2012

Type strain
- CCTCC AA 2010013; TRM 40137; KCTC 19988

Species of bacteria

Glycomyces halotolerans is a bacterium from the genus of Glycomyces which has been isolated from soil from Lop Nur in China.
