= Glycomyces sediminimaris =

Scientific classification
- Domain: Bacteria
- Kingdom: Bacillati
- Phylum: Actinomycetota
- Class: Actinomycetia
- Order: Glycomycetales
- Family: Glycomycetaceae
- Genus: Glycomyces
- Species: G. sediminimaris

Binomial name
- Glycomyces sediminimaris Mohammadipanah et al. 2018

Type strain
- DSM 103727; NCCB 100631; UTMC 2460; MH2460

Species of bacteria

Glycomyces sediminimaris is a bacterium from the genus of Glycomyces which has been isolated from marine sediments from Bushehr in Iran.
