= Glycomyces arizonensis =

Scientific classification
- Domain: Bacteria
- Kingdom: Bacillati
- Phylum: Actinomycetota
- Class: Actinomycetia
- Order: Glycomycetales
- Family: Glycomycetaceae
- Genus: Glycomyces
- Species: G. arizonensis

Binomial name
- Glycomyces arizonensis Labeda and Kroppenstedt 2004

Type strain
- DSM 44726; JCM 14911; NBRC 103886; NRLL B-16153; NRRL B-16153

Species of bacteria

Glycomyces arizonensis is a bacterium from the genus of Glycomyces which has been isolated from soil from a kangaroo rat burrow from Arizona in the United States.
