= Glycomyces sambucus =

Scientific classification
- Domain: Bacteria
- Kingdom: Bacillati
- Phylum: Actinomycetota
- Class: Actinomycetes
- Order: Glycomycetales
- Family: Glycomycetaceae
- Genus: Glycomyces
- Species: G. sambucus

Binomial name
- Glycomyces sambucus Gu et al. 2007

Type strain
- CGMCC 4.3147; DSM 45047; JCM 15472; E71

Species of bacteria

Glycomyces sambucus is a bacterium from the genus of Glycomyces which has been isolated from the stem of the tree Sambucus adnata from Xishuangbanna in China.
