= Glycomyces artemisiae =

Scientific classification
- Domain: Bacteria
- Kingdom: Bacillati
- Phylum: Actinomycetota
- Class: Actinomycetia
- Order: Glycomycetales
- Family: Glycomycetaceae
- Genus: Glycomyces
- Species: G. artemisiae

Binomial name
- Glycomyces artemisiae Zhang et al. 2014

Type strain
- CGMCC 4.7067; HBUM178000; NBRC 109773; IXS4

Species of bacteria

Glycomyces artemisiae is an endophytic bacterium from the genus of Glycomyces which has been isolated from roots of the plant Artemisia argyi from Yesanpo in China.
