= Glycomyces algeriensis =

Scientific classification
- Domain: Bacteria
- Kingdom: Bacillati
- Phylum: Actinomycetota
- Class: Actinomycetia
- Order: Glycomycetales
- Family: Glycomycetaceae
- Genus: Glycomyces
- Species: G. algeriensis

Binomial name
- Glycomyces algeriensis Labeda and Kroppenstedt 2004

Type strain
- DSM 44727; JCM 14910; NBRC 103888; NRRL B-16327

Species of bacteria

Glycomyces algeriensis is a bacterium from the genus of Glycomyces which has been isolated from soil from a potato field in Algeria.
