= Glycomyces lacisalsi =

Scientific classification
- Domain: Bacteria
- Kingdom: Bacillati
- Phylum: Actinomycetota
- Class: Actinomycetia
- Order: Glycomycetales
- Family: Glycomycetaceae
- Genus: Glycomyces
- Species: G. lacisalsi

Binomial name
- Glycomyces lacisalsi Guan et al. 2016

Type strain
- CCTCC AA 2015034; XHU 5089; KCTC 39688

Species of bacteria

Glycomyces lacisalsi is a Gram-positive and aerobic bacterium from the genus of Glycomyces.
