= Glycomyces rhizosphaerae =

Scientific classification
- Domain: Bacteria
- Kingdom: Bacillati
- Phylum: Actinomycetota
- Class: Actinomycetia
- Order: Glycomycetales
- Family: Glycomycetaceae
- Genus: Glycomyces
- Species: G. rhizosphaerae

Binomial name
- Glycomyces rhizosphaerae Li et al. 2018

Type strain
- CGMCC 4.7396; DSM 104646; NEAU-C11

Species of bacteria

Glycomyces rhizosphaerae is a bacterium from the genus of Glycomyces which has been isolated from rhizospheric soil of a soybean plant from Harbin in China.
