= Glycomyces albus =

Scientific classification
- Domain: Bacteria
- Kingdom: Bacillati
- Phylum: Actinomycetota
- Class: Actinomycetia
- Order: Glycomycetales
- Family: Glycomycetaceae
- Genus: Glycomyces
- Species: G. albus

Binomial name
- Glycomyces albus Han et al. 2014

Type strain
- CCTCC AA 2013004; TRM 49136; KACC 17681

Species of bacteria

Glycomyces albus is a bacterium from the genus of Glycomyces which has been isolated from hypersaline soil from Lop Nur in China.
