= Glycomyces phytohabitans =

Scientific classification
- Domain: Bacteria
- Kingdom: Bacillati
- Phylum: Actinomycetota
- Class: Actinomycetia
- Order: Glycomycetales
- Family: Glycomycetaceae
- Genus: Glycomyces
- Species: G. phytohabitans

Binomial name
- Glycomyces phytohabitans Xing et al. 2015

Type strain
- DSM 45766; KLBMP 1483; NBRC 109116

Species of bacteria

Glycomyces phytohabitans is an endophytic bacterium from the genus of Glycomyces which has been isolated from the roots of the plant Dendranthema indicum from Nantong in China.
