= Glycomyces tritici =

Scientific classification
- Domain: Bacteria
- Kingdom: Bacillati
- Phylum: Actinomycetota
- Class: Actinomycetia
- Order: Glycomycetales
- Family: Glycomycetaceae
- Genus: Glycomyces
- Species: G. tritici

Binomial name
- Glycomyces tritici Li et al. 2018

Type strain
- CGMCC 4.7410; DSM 104644; NEAU-C2

Species of bacteria

"Glycomyces tritici" is a bacterium from the genus of Glycomyces which has been isolated from rhizospheric soil from a wheat-plant (Triticum aestivum).
