= Erko Stackebrandt =

- Born: June 9, 1944

Erko Stackebrandt (born 9 June 1944) is a German microbiologist and bacteriologist known for his work in systematics, molecular phylogeny, and ecology of archaea and bacteria.

== Career ==
Stackebrandt was born on 9 June 1944 in Germany.

He has held prestigious positions, including chair in Microbiology at the University of Kiel (Germany) and Brisbane (Australia), and professor at the Technical University of Braunschweig. Stackebrandt also served as the Director of the Leibniz-Institute German Collection of Microorganisms and Cell Cultures GmbH in Braunschwei.

Stackebrandt has authored over 780 scientific publications and received numerous awards, including the Bergey Award and the J. Roger Porter Award. His research includes the systematic study of Cellulomonas and molecular diversity analyses in various ecosystems.

Stackebrandtia, a Gram-positive, aerobic and non-motile genus of bacteria from the family of Glycomycetaceae, is named after Stackebrandt.

== See also ==
- List of bacterial genera named after personal names - Wikipedia
