= Glycomyces mayteni =

Scientific classification
- Domain: Bacteria
- Kingdom: Bacillati
- Phylum: Actinomycetota
- Class: Actinomycetia
- Order: Glycomycetales
- Family: Glycomycetaceae
- Genus: Glycomyces
- Species: G. mayteni

Binomial name
- Glycomyces mayteni Qin et al. 2009

Type strain
- CCTCC AA 208004; YIM 61331; JCM 16217; KCTC 19527

Species of bacteria

Glycomyces mayteni is a bacterium from the genus of Glycomyces which has been isolated from the roots of the tree Maytenus austroyunnanensis from Xishuangbanna in China.
