= Glycomyces scopariae =

Scientific classification
- Domain: Bacteria
- Kingdom: Bacillati
- Phylum: Actinomycetota
- Class: Actinomycetia
- Order: Glycomycetales
- Family: Glycomycetaceae
- Genus: Glycomyces
- Species: G. scopariae

Binomial name
- Glycomyces scopariae Qin et al. 2009

Type strain
- DSM 44968; JCM 16218; KCTC 19158; YIM 56256

Species of bacteria

Glycomyces scopariae is a bacterium from the genus of Glycomyces which has been isolated from roots of the plant Scoparia dulcis from Xishuangbanna in China.
