= Stackebrandtia albiflava =

Scientific classification
- Domain: Bacteria
- Kingdom: Bacillati
- Phylum: Actinomycetota
- Class: Actinomycetes
- Order: Glycomycetales
- Family: Glycomycetaceae
- Genus: Stackebrandtia
- Species: S. albiflava

Binomial name
- Stackebrandtia albiflava Wang et al. 2009

Type strain
- CCTCC AA 206003; DSM 45044; JCM 18122; YIM 45751

Synonyms
- Stackebrandtia flavoalba

Species of bacteria

Stackebrandtia albiflava is a bacterium from the genus of Stackebrandtia which has been isolated from soil from the Xishuang Banna tropical rainforest in China.
