= Glycomyces endophyticus =

Scientific classification
- Domain: Bacteria
- Kingdom: Bacillati
- Phylum: Actinomycetota
- Class: Actinomycetia
- Order: Glycomycetales
- Family: Glycomycetaceae
- Genus: Glycomyces
- Species: G. endophyticus

Binomial name
- Glycomyces endophyticus Qin et al. 2008

Type strain
- DSM 45002; JCM 16001; KCTC 19152; YIM 56134

Species of bacteria

Glycomyces endophyticus is an endophytic bacterium from the genus of Glycomyces which has been isolated from the roots of the plant Carex baccans from Xishuangbanna in China.
