= Glycomyces xiaoerkulensis =

Scientific classification
- Domain: Bacteria
- Kingdom: Bacillati
- Phylum: Actinomycetota
- Class: Actinomycetia
- Order: Glycomycetales
- Family: Glycomycetaceae
- Genus: Glycomyces
- Species: G. xiaoerkulensis

Binomial name
- Glycomyces xiaoerkulensis Wang et al. 2018

Type strain
- CCTCC AA 2017005; TRM 41368; KCTC 39932

Species of bacteria

Glycomyces xiaoerkulensis is a Gram-positive and aerobic bacterium from the genus of Glycomyces which has been isolated from silt from Xiaoerkule lake in China.
