= Streptomyces kalpinensis =

Scientific classification
- Domain: Bacteria
- Kingdom: Bacillati
- Phylum: Actinomycetota
- Class: Actinomycetia
- Order: Streptomycetales
- Family: Streptomycetaceae
- Genus: Streptomyces
- Species: S. kalpinensis

Binomial name
- Streptomyces kalpinensis Ma et al. 2017

Type strain
- CCTCC AA 2015028, KCTC 39667, TRM 46509

Species of bacterium

Streptomyces kalpinensis is a Gram-positive bacterium species from the genus of Streptomyces which has been isolated from sand from the beach of Kalpin in China.

== See also ==
- List of Streptomyces species
