= Stackebrandtia soli =

Scientific classification
- Domain: Bacteria
- Kingdom: Bacillati
- Phylum: Actinomycetota
- Class: Actinomycetes
- Order: Glycomycetales
- Family: Glycomycetaceae
- Genus: Stackebrandtia
- Species: S. soli

Binomial name
- Stackebrandtia soli Liu et al. 2018

Type strain
- DSM 103573; KCTC 39809; AN130378

Species of bacteria

Stackebrandtia soli is a bacterium from the genus of Stackebrandtia which has been isolated from soil from Korea.
