= Glycomyces tarimensis =

Scientific classification
- Domain: Bacteria
- Kingdom: Bacillati
- Phylum: Actinomycetota
- Class: Actinomycetia
- Order: Glycomycetales
- Family: Glycomycetaceae
- Genus: Glycomyces
- Species: G. tarimensis

Binomial name
- Glycomyces tarimensis Lv et al. 2015

Type strain
- CCTCC AA 2014007; TRM 45387; JCM 30184

Species of bacteria

Glycomyces tarimensis is a bacterium from the genus of Glycomyces which has been isolated from saline-alkali soil from Kalpin County in China.
