= Glycomyces paridis =

Scientific classification
- Domain: Bacteria
- Kingdom: Bacillati
- Phylum: Actinomycetota
- Class: Actinomycetia
- Order: Glycomycetales
- Family: Glycomycetaceae
- Genus: Glycomyces
- Species: G. paridis

Binomial name
- Glycomyces paridis Fang et al. 2018

Type strain
- DSM 102295; KCTC 39745; CPCC 204357

Species of bacteria

Glycomyces paridis is a bacterium from the genus of Glycomyces which has been isolated from the roots of the plant Paris polyphylla var. yunnanensis from Xishuangbanna in China.
