= Haloglycomyces albus =

Scientific classification
- Domain: Bacteria
- Kingdom: Bacillati
- Phylum: Actinomycetota
- Class: Actinomycetes
- Order: Glycomycetales
- Family: Glycomycetaceae
- Genus: Haloglycomyces; Guan et al. 2009
- Species: H. albus

Binomial name
- Haloglycomyces albus Guan et al. 2009

Type strain
- DSM 45210; JCM 16899; KCTC 19481; YIM 92370

Species of bacteria

Haloglycomyces albus is a Gram-positive, anaerobic and moderately halophilic species of bacteria from the family of Glycomycetaceae.
