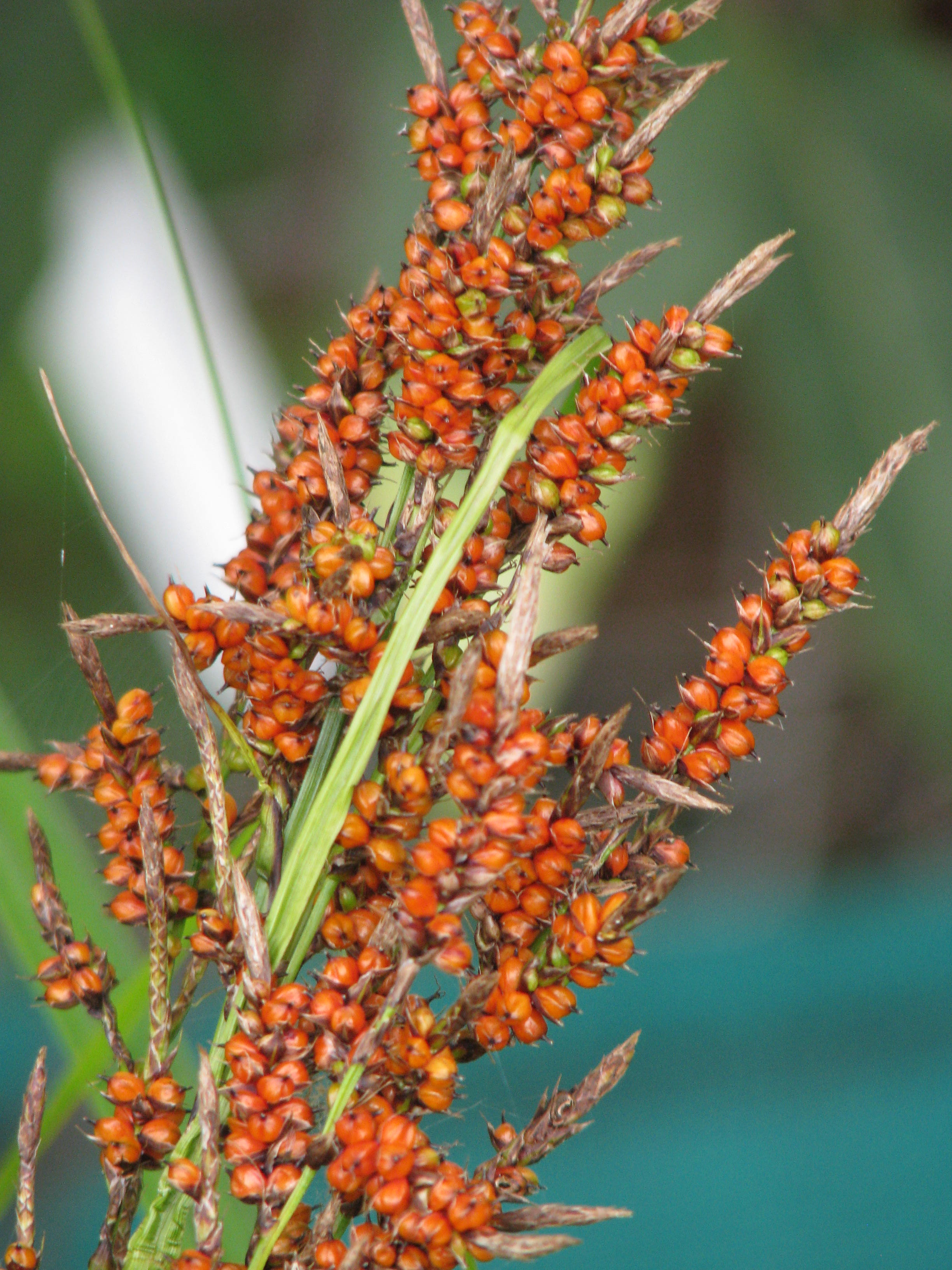
- Seedheads
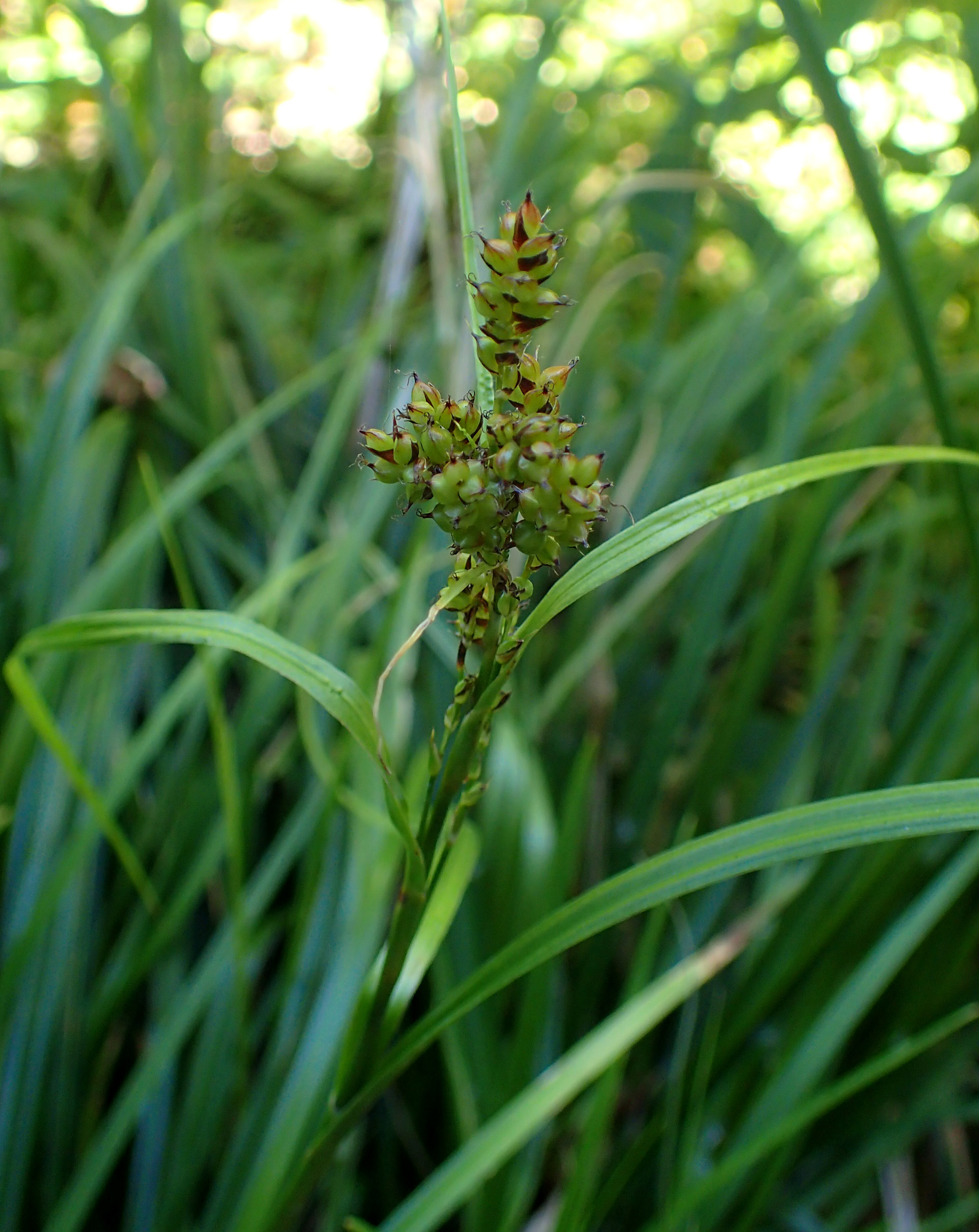
- At the San Francisco Botanical Garden

Conservation status
- Least Concern (IUCN 3.1)

Scientific classification
- Kingdom: Plantae
- Clade: Tracheophytes
- Clade: Angiosperms
- Clade: Monocots
- Clade: Commelinids
- Order: Poales
- Family: Cyperaceae
- Genus: Carex
- Species: C. baccans

Binomial name
- Carex baccans Nees

Synonyms
- Carex curvirostris Kunze; Carex javanica Boeckeler; Carex recurvirostra Kunze

= Carex baccans =

Species of grass-like plant

Carex baccans, the crimson-seeded sedge, is a species of flowering plant in the family Cyperaceae, with a widespread distribution in subtropical and tropical Asia; most of the Indian Subcontinent, southern China, most of Malesia (except Borneo), and on to New Guinea. An endophytic bacteria species, Glycomyces endophyticus, has been isolated from its roots.
