= Salininema proteolyticum =

Scientific classification
- Domain: Bacteria
- Kingdom: Bacillati
- Phylum: Actinomycetota
- Class: Actinomycetes
- Order: Glycomycetales
- Family: Glycomycetaceae
- Genus: Salininema; Nikou et al. 2015
- Species: S. proteolyticum

Binomial name
- Salininema proteolyticum Nikou et al. 2015

Type strain
- IBRC-M 10908; LMG 28391; Miq-4

Synonyms
- Genus: Paraglycomyces Luo et al. 2015; Species: Paraglycomyces xinjiangensis Luo et al. 2015

Species of bacteria

Salininema is a Gram-positive and halophilic species of bacteria from the family of Glycomycetaceae.
