= Salilacibacter albus =

Scientific classification
- Domain: Bacteria
- Kingdom: Bacillati
- Phylum: Actinomycetota
- Class: Actinomycetes
- Order: Glycomycetales
- Family: Glycomycetaceae
- Genus: Salilacibacter; Li et al. 2016
- Species: S. albus

Binomial name
- Salilacibacter albus Li et al. 2016

Type strain
- CGMCC 4.7242; DSM 46875; J11Y309; LMG 29297

Species of bacteria

Salilacibacter albus is a species of bacteria from the family of Glycomycetaceae. Salilacibacter albus has been isolated from soil from a dried salt lake in China.
