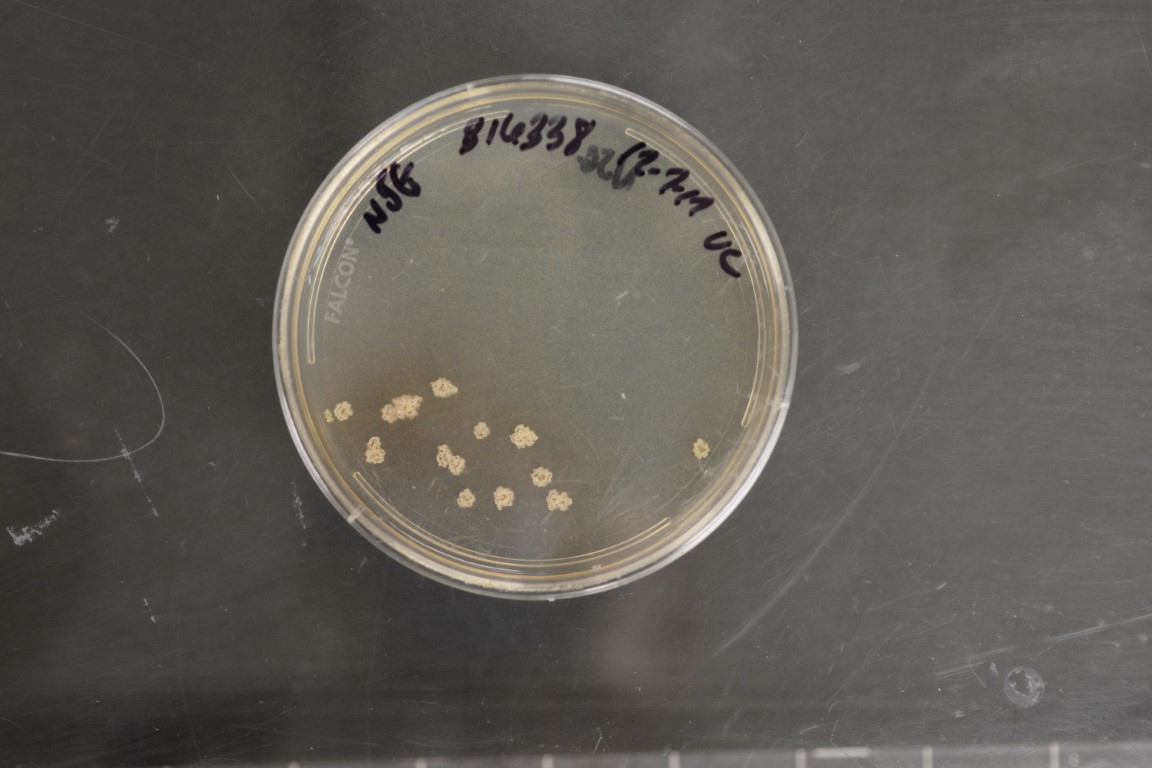
- Type strain of Stackebrandtia nassauensis

Scientific classification
- Domain: Bacteria
- Kingdom: Bacillati
- Phylum: Actinomycetota
- Class: Actinomycetes
- Order: Glycomycetales
- Family: Glycomycetaceae
- Genus: Stackebrandtia; Labeda and Kroppenstedt 2005

Type species
- Stackebrandtia nassauensis Labeda and Kroppenstedt 2005

Species
- S. albiflava; S. cavernae; S. endophytica; "Ca. S. excrementipullorum"; "Ca. S. faecavium"; S. nassauensis; S. soli

= Stackebrandtia =

Genus of bacteria

Stackebrandtia is a Gram-positive, aerobic and non-motile genus of bacteria from the family Glycomycetaceae. Stackebrandtia is named after the German microbiologist Erko Stackebrandt.

== Phylogeny ==
The currently accepted taxonomy is based on the List of Prokaryotic names with Standing in Nomenclature (LPSN) and National Center for Biotechnology Information (NCBI).

16S rRNA based LTP_10_2024

- Stackebrandtia
  - - S. cavernae Zhang et al. 2016
    - S. nassauensis Labeda and Kroppenstedt 2005
  - - S. soli Liu et al. 2018
    - - S. albiflava Wang et al. 2009
      - S. endophytica Xiong et al. 2015

120 marker proteins based GTDB 10-RS226

- Stackebrandtia
  - - "Ca. S. faecavium" Gilroy et al. 2021
    - S. nassauensis
  - - S. albiflava
    - - S. endophytica
      - "Ca. S. excrementipullorum" Gilroy et al. 2021

== See also ==
- List of bacterial orders
- List of bacteria genera
