= Glycomyces =

Scientific classification
- Domain: Bacteria
- Kingdom: Bacillati
- Phylum: Actinomycetota
- Class: Actinomycetes
- Order: Glycomycetales
- Family: Glycomycetaceae
- Genus: Glycomyces; Labeda et al. 1985

Type species
- Glycomyces harbinensis Labeda et al. 1985

Species
- See text

Genus of bacteria

Glycomyces is a genus of Gram-positive bacteria.

== Phylogeny ==
The currently accepted taxonomy is based on the List of Prokaryotic names with Standing in Nomenclature (LPSN) and National Center for Biotechnology Information (NCBI).

16S rRNA based LTP_10_2024

- Glycomyces
  - - - G. tarimensis Lv et al. 2015
      - - G. tenuis Evtushenko et al. 1991
        - - G. arizonensis Labeda and Kroppenstedt 2004
          - - G. phytohabitans Xing et al. 2015
            - G. sediminimaris Mohammadipanah et al. 2018
    - - - G. fuscus Han et al. 2014
        - G. xiaoerkulensis Wang et al. 2018
      - - G. halotolerans Guan et al. 2012
        - - - G. anabasis Zhang et al. 2018
            - G. lacisalsi Guan et al. 2016
          - - G. albus Han et al. 2014
            - G. salinus Li et al. 2022
  - - G. buryatensis Nikitina et al. 2020
    - - - - G. terrestris Li et al. 2021
          - - G. albidus Qian et al. 2020
            - G. mayteni Qin et al. 2009
        - - - G. artemisiae Zhang et al. 2014
            - G. dulcitolivorans Mu et al. 2018
          - - G. sambucus Gu et al. 2007
            - G. scopariae Qin et al. 2009
      - - G. paridis Fang et al. 2018
        - - G. amatae Suriyachadkun et al. 2022
          - - G. harbinensis Labeda et al. 1985
            - - G. endophyticus Qin et al. 2008
              - - G. rhizosphaerae Li et al. 2018
                - - G. rutgersensis Labeda et al. 1985
                  - - G. lechevalierae Labeda and Kroppenstedt 2004
                    - - G. algeriensis Labeda and Kroppenstedt 2004
                      - - G. luteolus Duan et al. 2024
                        - G. tritici Li et al. 2024

120 marker proteins based GTDB 10-RS226

- Glycomyces
  - - G. salinus
    - G. xiaoerkulensis
  - - - G. arizonensis
      - G. tenuis
    - - G. buryatensis
      - - G. paridis
        - - - - G. amatae
              - G. harbinensis
            - - G. niveus Yang et al. 2024
              - - G. rutgersensis [incl. G. lechevalierae]
                - - G. algeriensis
                  - G. luteolus
          - - G. albidus
            - - G. terrestris
              - - - G. dulcitolivorans
                  - G. endophyticus
                - - G. artemisiae
                  - G. sambucus

Species incertae sedis:

- "G. illinoisensis" Labeda & Kroppenstedt 2003
- "G. mongolensis" Tsetseg et al. 2007
- G. xinjiangensis Guan et al. 2025

== See also ==
- List of bacterial orders
- List of bacteria genera
