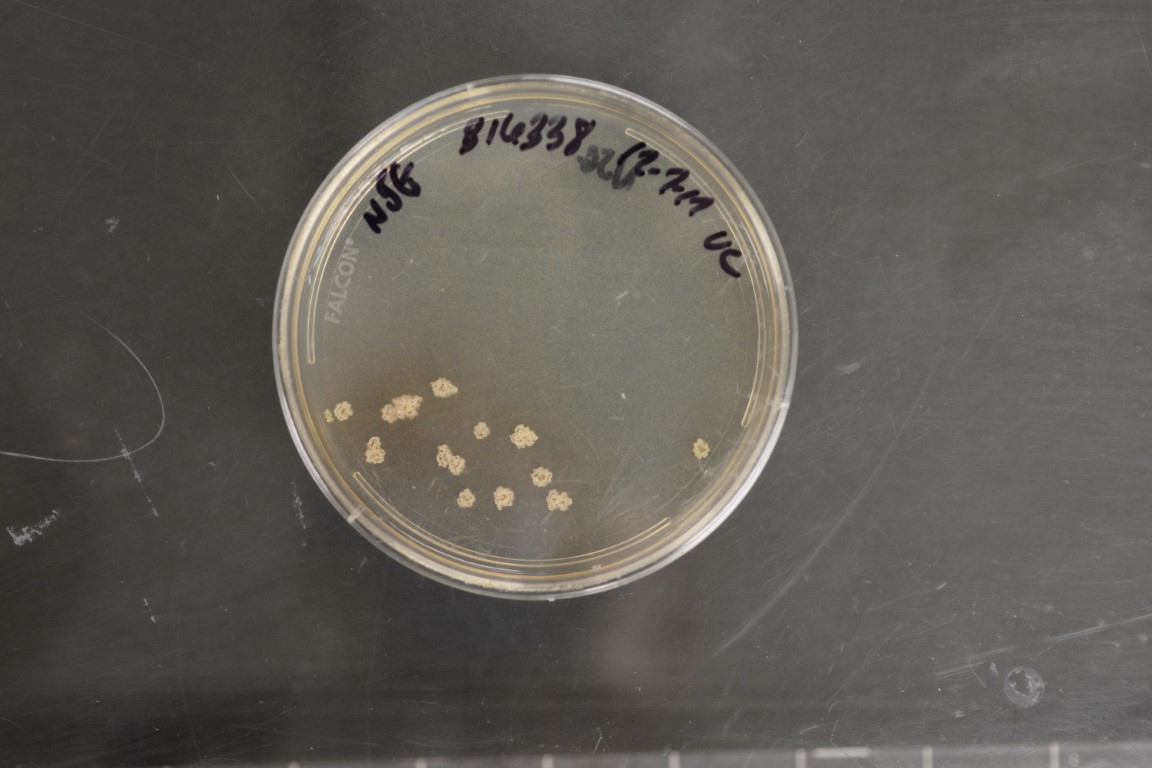

Scientific classification
- Domain: Bacteria
- Kingdom: Bacillati
- Phylum: Actinomycetota
- Class: Actinomycetes
- Order: Glycomycetales
- Family: Glycomycetaceae
- Genus: Stackebrandtia
- Species: S. nassauensis

Binomial name
- Stackebrandtia nassauensis Labeda and Kroppenstedt 2005

Type strain
- DSM 44728; JCM 14905; NBRC 102104; NRRL B-16338; LLR-40K-21

= Stackebrandtia nassauensis =

Species of bacteria

Stackebrandtia nassauensis is a bacterium from the genus of Stackebrandtia which has been isolated from soil from a roadside from Nassau in Puerto Rico.
