= Kalpin County =

Kalpin County: كەلپىن ناھىيىسى (Uyghur); 柯坪县 (Chinese); Kelpin, Keping, Koping
- County
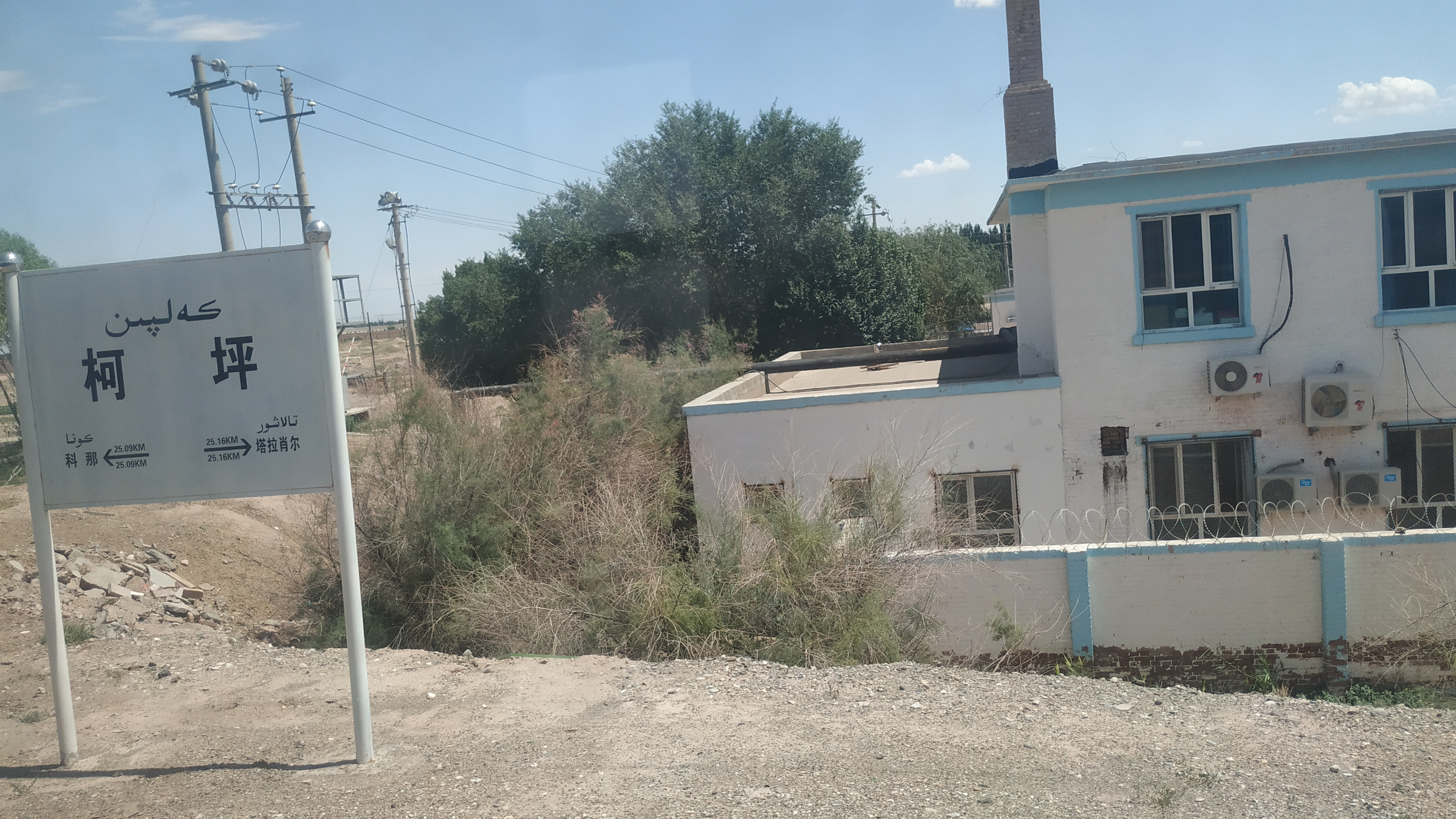
- Kalpin railway station

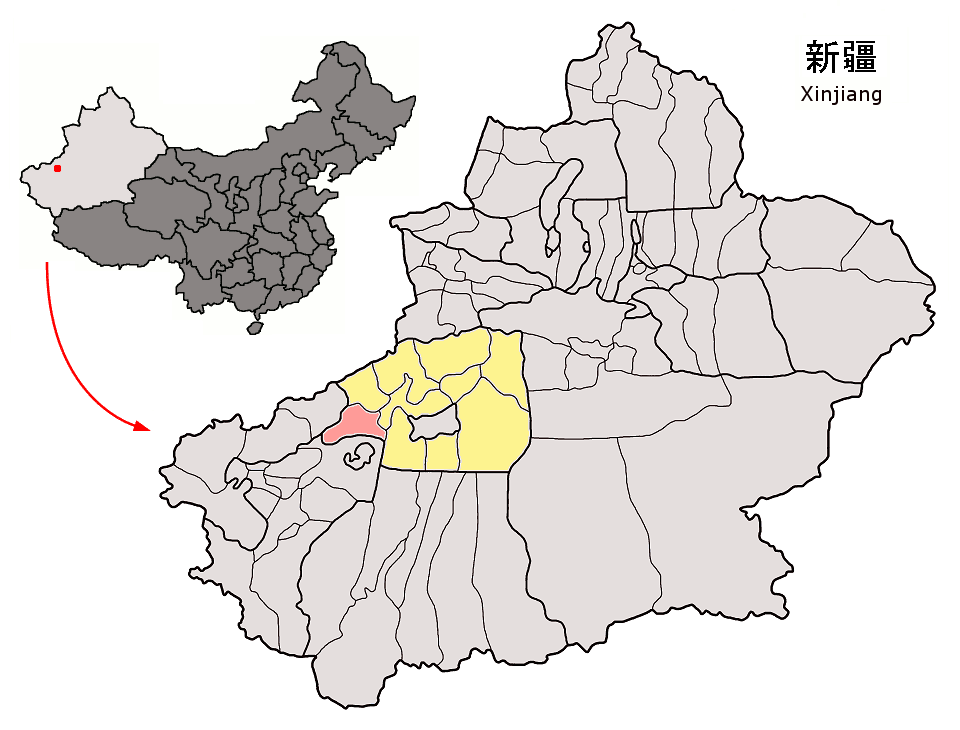
- Location of Kalpin County (red) within Aksu Prefecture (yellow) and Xinjiang

- Location of the seat Kalpin County (China)
- Coordinates: 40°26′36″N 79°02′28″E
- Country: China
- Autonomous region: Xinjiang
- Prefecture: Aksu
- County seat: Kelpin Town

Area
  - Total: 8,912 km^{2} (3,441 sq mi)

Population (2020)
  - Total: 50,619
  - Density: 5.680/km^{2} (14.71/sq mi)

Ethnic groups
  - Major ethnic groups: Uyghur
- Time zone: UTC+8 (China Standard (Note: Locals in Xinjiang frequently observe UTC+6 (Xinjiang Time), 2 hours behind Beijing.))
- Website: www.xjkpx.gov.cn (in Chinese)

Kalpin County

Uyghur name
- Uyghur: كەلپىن ناھىيىسى
Transcriptions
- Latin Yëziqi: Kelpin Nahiyisi
- Yengi Yeziⱪ: Kəlpin Naⱨiyisi
- SASM/GNC: Kalpin Nahiyisi
- Siril Yëziqi: Келпин Наһийиси

Chinese name
- Simplified Chinese: 柯坪县
- Traditional Chinese: 柯坪縣
Transcriptions
Standard Mandarin
- Hanyu Pinyin: Kēpíng Xiàn
- Wade–Giles: Kʻo^{1}-pʻing^{2} Hsien^{4}

Kalpin County is a county in the Xinjiang Uygur Autonomous Region and is under the administration of the Aksu Prefecture. The overwhelmingly Uyghur population of the county lives on oases at the base of the Tian Shan (Tangri Tagh) mountains and on the edge of the Taklamakan Desert.

== History ==
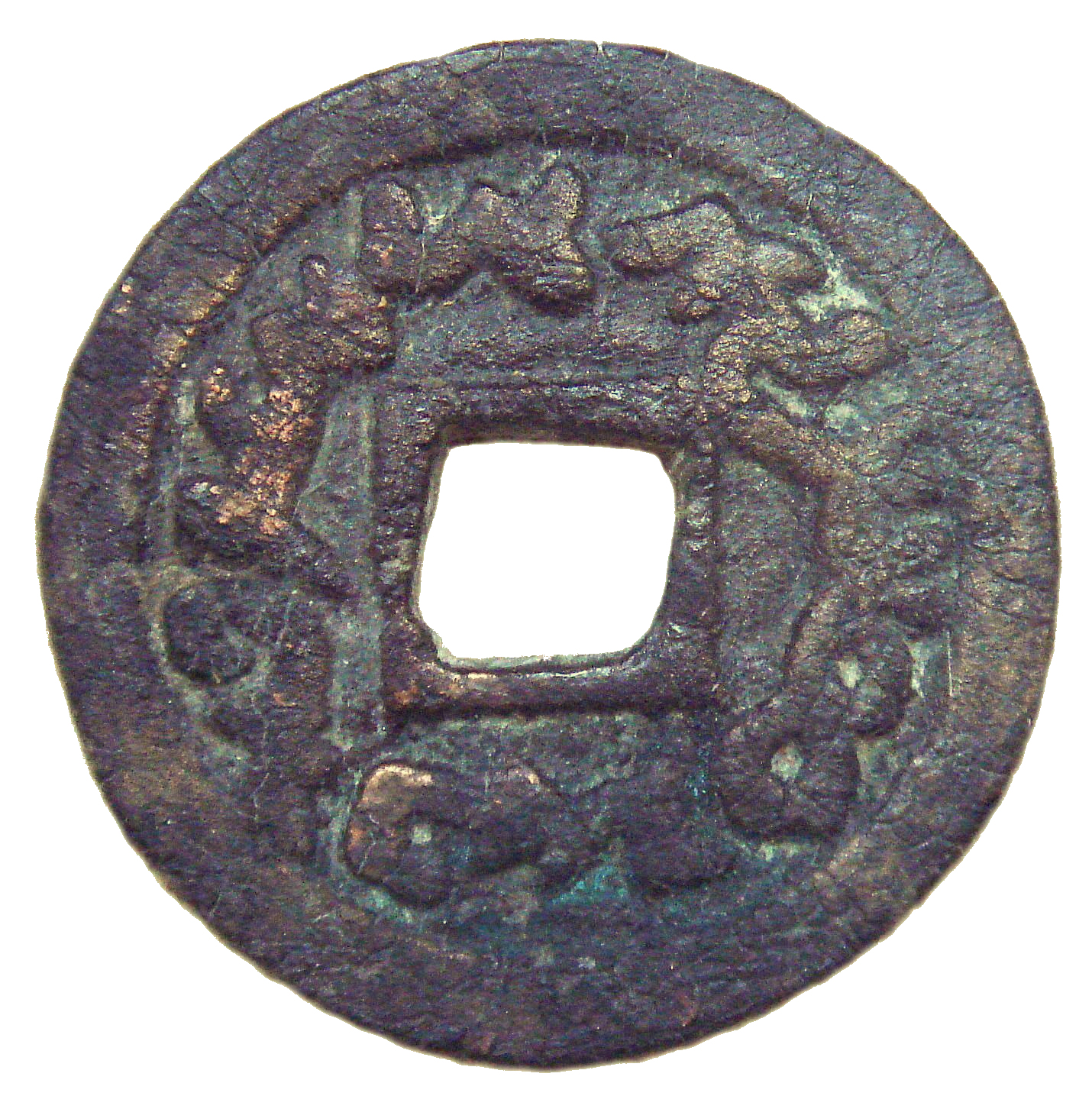
Chinese-influenced Sogdian coin, from Kelpin, 8th century, British Museum

In 1902, a xiancheng (縣丞) was created at Kalpin. In 1930, a xianzhi (縣治) was created at Kalpin.

According to Radio Free Asia, in 2008, Chinese authorities demolished a Uyghur mosque 80 km (50 mi) from the Upper Kumtagh village in Kalpin County because the mosque was said to be illegally built and said to have been conducting illegal religious activities.

On February 20, 2009, a 5.2 magnitude earthquake struck at a location 35 km (22 mi) from the county seats of Kalpin and Akqi counties. 207 aftershocks had been recorded by 11 AM on February 22. More than ten thousand houses were damaged and 182 were destroyed. Forty tents were set up and 12,400 people were relocated. The county received one million CNY in rescue funds from nearby government offices.

On April 12, 2014 at 11:40 PM, Abdulbasit Ablimit (Abdubasit Ablimit), 17, of Qum'eriq village in Yurqi (Yurchi, Yu'erqi), was shot and killed by police while riding a motorcycle. Two other Uyghurs were injured. Four to five hundred people from their village participated in a protest at the county office demanding that the police officer be punished according to law. More than thirty of the protesters were detained and some were beaten. Tianshannet reported that on the following Wednesday, a man in Urumqi was detained by police for spreading rumors about the incident. The Uyghur American Association condemned the killing.

On April 3, 2015, Aqal (ئاچال Aqiale, Achal), then a township, was made a town.

According to research presented in The Diplomat, Xinjiang Nuodun Garment Co., Ltd. (新疆诺顿服装有限公司), a company based in Kalpin County, was founded in July 2017. The company has made shipments of men and women's trousers to four companies in the United States. The company is also mentioned in the context of Aksu Prefecture's wider policy related to re-education camps in the Aksu Daily.

== Geography ==
The county is made up of territory in the Tian Shan mountain range and the Taklamakan Desert. Kalpin, Gezlik and Yurqi are located west of Aqal. Qilan is located east of Aqal on the border with Aksu City. Mountain ranges in the county include Bozake Tagh, Kelpin Chöl Tagh, Chong Kizil Tagh, Kankerin Tagh, Chong Korum Tagh and Akin Bek Tagh. Rivers and streams in the county include Koram Boghuz, Chilan Su and Sargan.

== Climate ==
Climate data for Kalpin, elevation 1,162 m (3,812 ft), (1991–2020 normals, extremes 1970–present)
Month	Jan	Feb	Mar	Apr	May	Jun	Jul	Aug	Sep	Oct	Nov	Dec	Year
Record high °C (°F)	9.2 (48.6)	15.6 (60.1)	27.8 (82.0)	35.4 (95.7)	36.2 (97.2)	39.8 (103.6)	41.9 (107.4)	42.7 (108.9)	37.4 (99.3)	31.2 (88.2)	23.9 (75.0)	15.9 (60.6)	42.7 (108.9)
Mean daily maximum °C (°F)	−0.6 (30.9)	5.9 (42.6)	15.3 (59.5)	23.6 (74.5)	28.2 (82.8)	31.7 (89.1)	33.4 (92.1)	32.3 (90.1)	27.8 (82.0)	20.7 (69.3)	10.7 (51.3)	1.5 (34.7)	19.2 (66.6)
Daily mean °C (°F)	−7.5 (18.5)	−0.9 (30.4)	8.3 (46.9)	16.3 (61.3)	20.6 (69.1)	23.8 (74.8)	25.3 (77.5)	24.2 (75.6)	19.6 (67.3)	11.9 (53.4)	2.9 (37.2)	−5.0 (23.0)	11.6 (52.9)
Mean daily minimum °C (°F)	−13.3 (8.1)	−7.0 (19.4)	1.5 (34.7)	8.8 (47.8)	13.3 (55.9)	16.4 (61.5)	18.2 (64.8)	17.1 (62.8)	12.3 (54.1)	4.5 (40.1)	−3.2 (26.2)	−9.9 (14.2)	4.9 (40.8)
Record low °C (°F)	−27.5 (−17.5)	−28.1 (−18.6)	−17.3 (0.9)	−3.6 (25.5)	3.5 (38.3)	8.5 (47.3)	9.5 (49.1)	9.4 (48.9)	3.2 (37.8)	−3.9 (25.0)	−13.6 (7.5)	−25.0 (−13.0)	−28.1 (−18.6)
Average precipitation mm (inches)	2.0 (0.08)	3.0 (0.12)	4.0 (0.16)	4.0 (0.16)	13.8 (0.54)	22.2 (0.87)	26.6 (1.05)	26.1 (1.03)	15.0 (0.59)	4.0 (0.16)	0.9 (0.04)	1.8 (0.07)	123.4 (4.87)
Average precipitation days (≥ 0.1 mm)	2.5	2.1	1.0	1.5	4.7	7.8	9.2	7.9	4.7	1.3	0.9	2.1	45.7
Average snowy days	4.7	3.0	0.6	0	0	0	0	0	0	0	1.0	4.4	13.7
Average relative humidity (%)	66	55	40	33	37	42	46	49	51	51	57	69	50
Mean monthly sunshine hours	185.7	181.5	194.6	207.8	248.5	267.8	274.6	257.2	238.1	242.9	197.7	172.6	2,669
Percentage possible sunshine	61	59	52	51	55	60	61	62	65	72	68	60	61
Source: China Meteorological Administrationall-time September high

== Administrative divisions ==
Kalpin County included three towns and two townships:

Name	Simplified Chinese	Hanyu Pinyin	Uyghur (UEY)	Uyghur Latin (ULY)	Administrative division code	Notes
Towns
Kalpin Town	柯坪镇	Kēpíng Zhèn	كەلپىن بازىرى	kelpin baziri	652929100	
Gezlik Town	盖孜力克镇	Gàizīlìkè Zhèn	گەزلىك بازىرى	gezlik baziri	652929101	
Aqal Town	阿恰勒镇	Āqiàlè Zhèn	ئاچال بازىرى	Achal baziri	652929102	formerly Achal Township (阿恰勒乡)
Townships
Yurqi Township	玉尔其乡	Yù'ěrqí Xiāng	يۈرچى يېزىسى	yurchi yëzisi	652929201	
Qilan Township	启浪乡	Qǐlàng Xiāng	چىلان يېزىسى	chilan yëzisi	652929203	

== Economy ==
Kalpin County's economy is primarily agricultural, producing wheat, corn, sorghum, cotton, etc. Animal husbandry is also strong, including the raising of camels, sheep and other animals. Mineral resources include sulfur. Industries include mining, concrete and cotton processing among others.

Spoons and other tableware made from the fragrant wood of apricot trees are a traditional product produced in the county.

There is 126,000 mu of arable land in the county. As of 1885, there was about 4,270 acres (28,164 mu) of cultivated land in Kalpin.

== Demographics ==
Historical population
Year	Pop.	±% p.a.
2000	38,584	—
2010	44,261	+1.38%

As of 2015, 53,804 of the 55,425 residents of the county were Uyghur, 1,501 were Han Chinese and 120 were from other ethnic groups.

According to the 2002 census, it has a population of 40,000.

As of 1999, 97.31% of the population of Kalpin County was Uyghur and 2.54% of the population was Han Chinese.

== Transportation ==
- China National Highway 314

== Historical maps ==
Historical English-language maps including Kalpin:

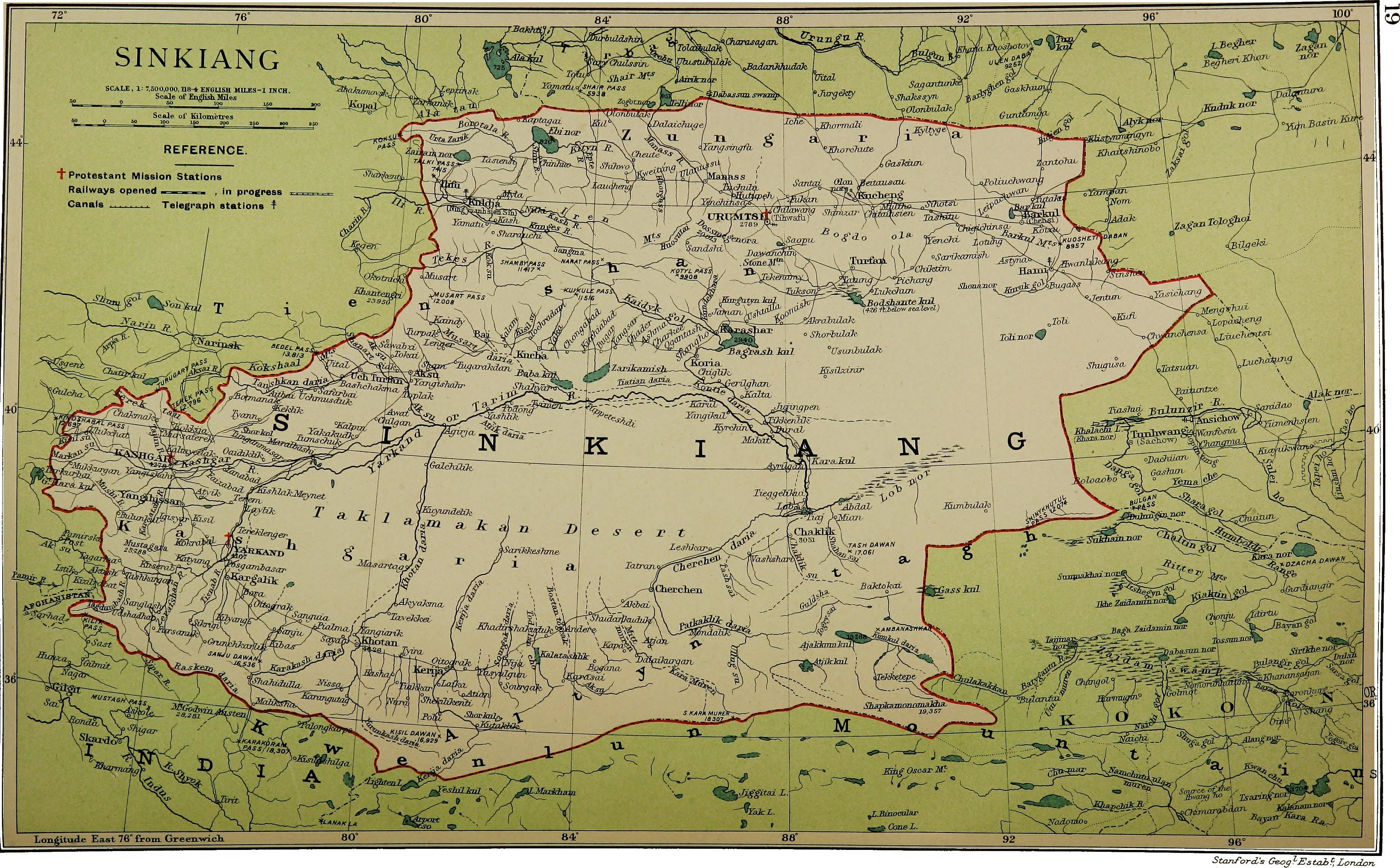
Map including Kalpin (1917)

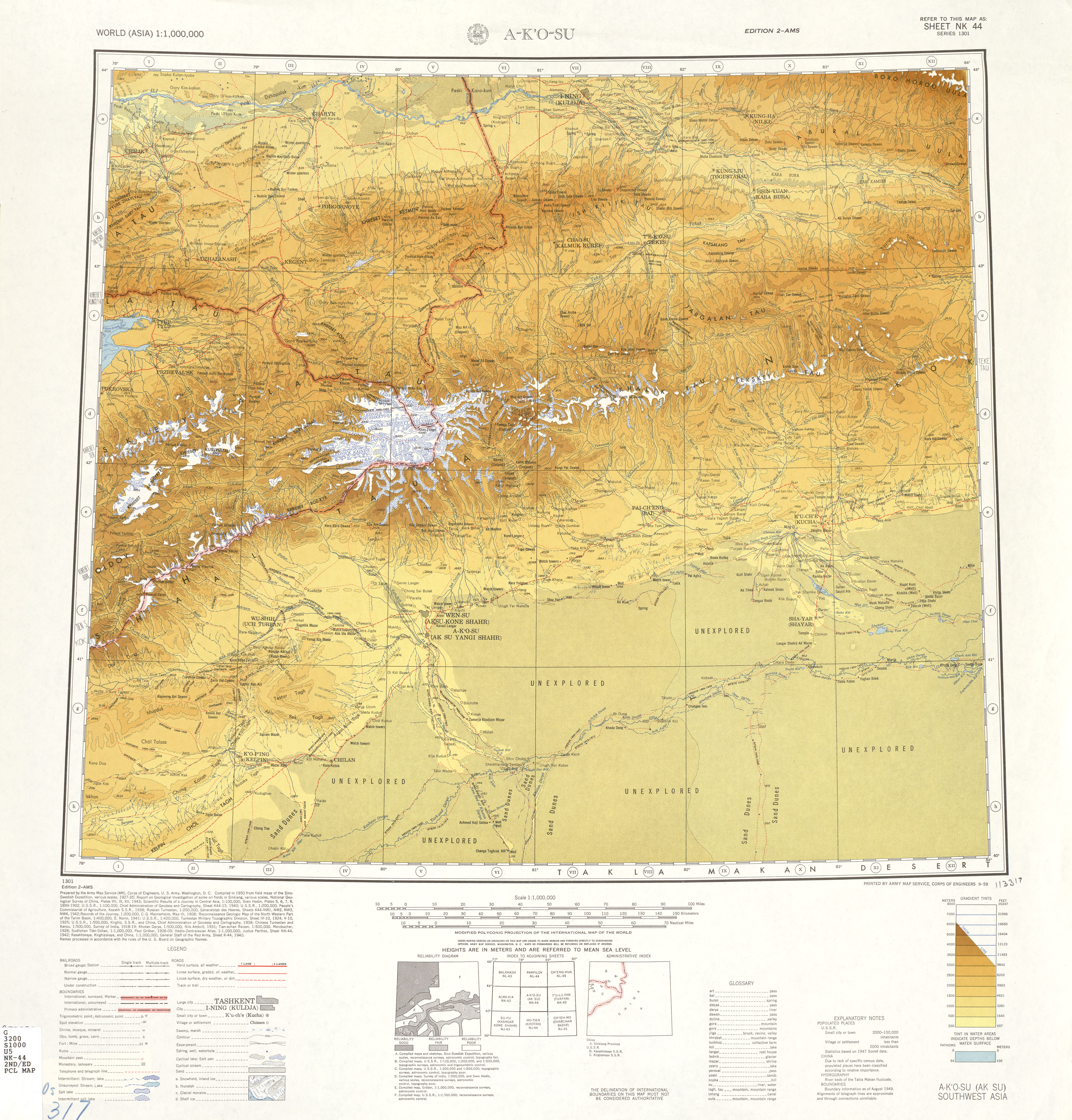
Map including Kalpin (labeled as K'O-P'ING (KELPIN)) and surrounding region from the International Map of the World (AMS, 1950) (Note: From map: "THE DELINEATION OF INTERNATIONAL BOUNDARIES ON THIS MAP MUST NOT BE CONSIDERED AUTHORITATIVE")

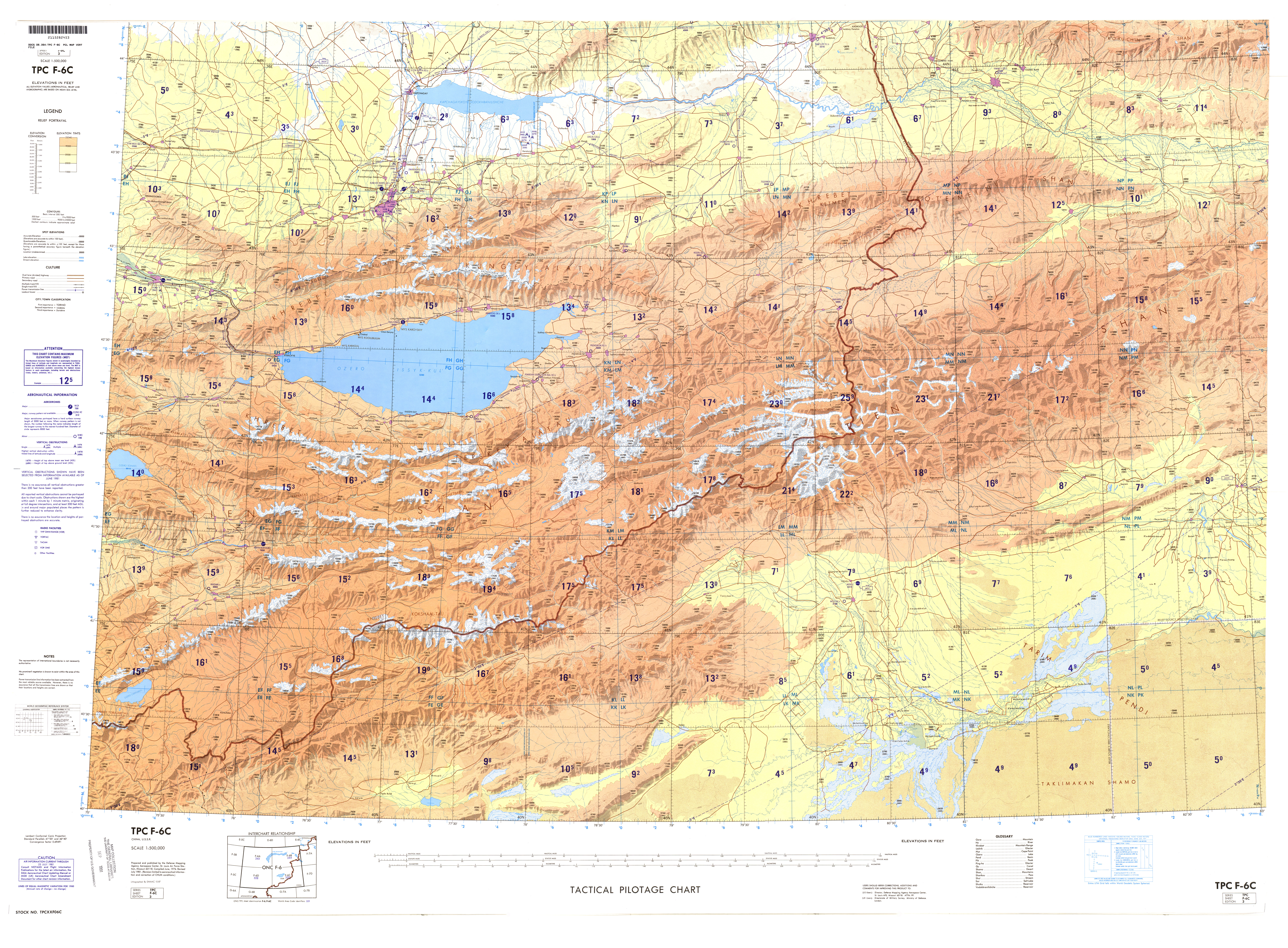
Map including Kalpin (DMA, 1981)

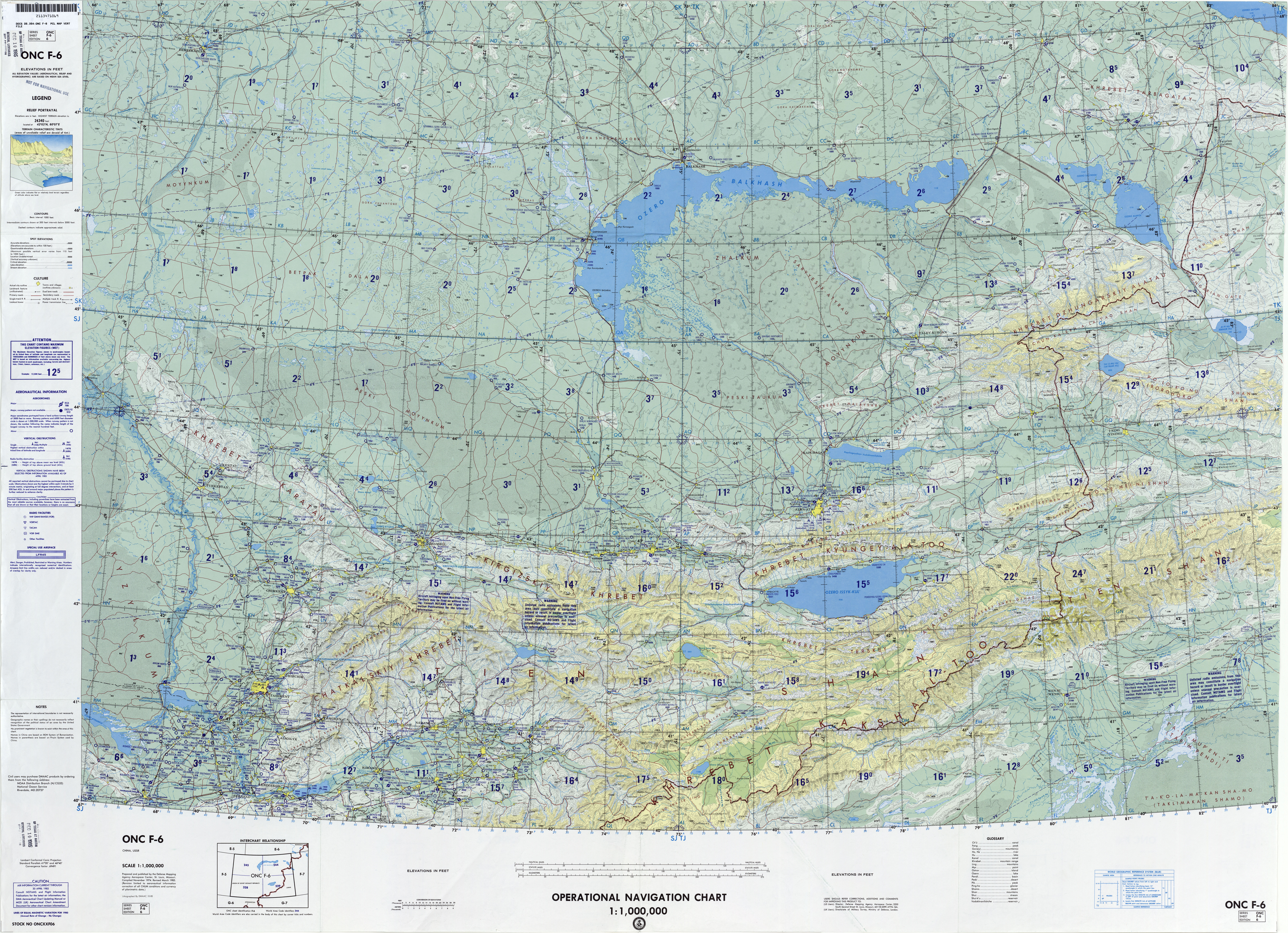
From the Operational Navigation Chart; map including Kalpin (labeled as K'o-p'ing (Kalpin)) (DMA, 1985) (Note: From map: "The representation of international boundaries is not necessarily authoritative.")

== See also ==
- Glycomyces tarimensis, discovered in soil from the county
