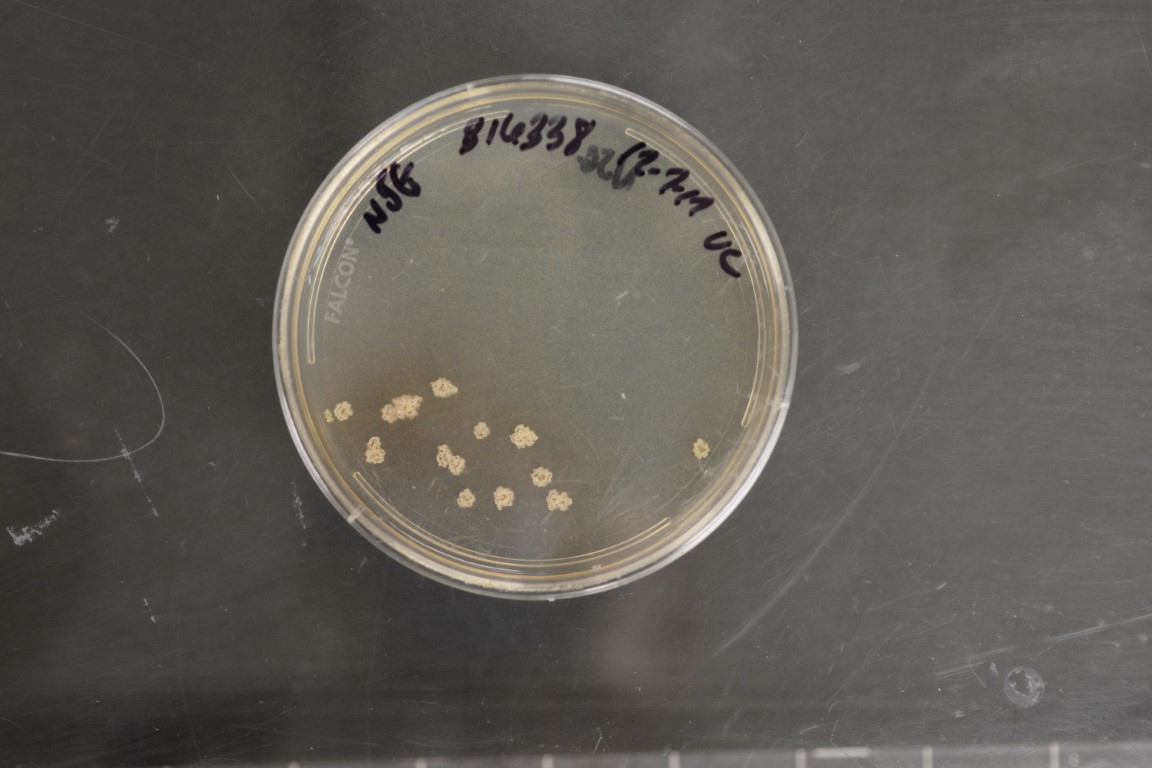
- Type strain of Stackebrandtia nassauensis

Scientific classification
- Domain: Bacteria
- Kingdom: Bacillati
- Phylum: Actinomycetota
- Class: Actinomycetes
- Order: Glycomycetales; Labeda 2015
- Family: Glycomycetaceae; Rainey et al. 1997

Type genus
- Glycomyces Labeda et al. 1985

Genera
- Glycomyces; Haloglycomyces; Natronoglycomyces; Salilacibacter; Salininema; Stackebrandtia

Synonyms
- Glycomycetineae corrig. Rainey et al. 1997

= Glycomycetaceae =

Family of bacteria

Glycomycetaceae is a family of bacteria.

== Phylogeny ==
The currently accepted taxonomy is based on the List of Prokaryotic names with Standing in Nomenclature (LPSN) and National Center for Biotechnology Information (NCBI).

Whole-genome based phylogeny

- - Glycomycetales
    - Glycomycetaceae
      - Stackebrandtia
      - - Haloglycomyces
        - Glycomyces
  - Micromonosporales
    - Actinocatenisporaceae
    - Micromonosporaceae

16S rRNA based LTP_10_2024

- Micromonosporales
  - Actinocatenisporaceae
  - - - Phytomonosporaceae
      - - Glycomycetaceae
          - Stackebrandtia Labeda & Kroppenstedt 2005
          - - Natronoglycomyces Sorokin et al. 2021
            - - - Salininema corrig. Nikou et al. 2015
                - - Haloglycomyces Guan et al. 2009
                  - Salilacibacter Li et al. 2016b
              - Glycomyces Labeda et al. 1985
    - Micromonosporaceae

120 marker proteins based GTDB 10-RS226

- Micromonosporaceae s.l.
  - - (Phytomonosporaceae)
    - - (Glycomycetaceae)
        - Stackebrandtia
        - - Natronoglycomyces
          - - Haloglycomyces
            - Glycomyces
  - - (Actinocatenisporaceae)
    - (Micromonosporaceae) s.s.

== See also ==
- List of bacterial orders
- List of bacteria genera
